= Face and neck development of the human embryo =

Development in 3rd to 8th week of gestation

The face and neck development of the human embryo refers to the development of the structures from the third to eighth week that give rise to the future head and neck. They consist of three layers, the ectoderm, mesoderm and endoderm, which form the mesenchyme (derived from the lateral plate mesoderm and paraxial mesoderm), neural crest and neural placodes (from the ectoderm). The paraxial mesoderm forms structures named somites and somitomeres that contribute to the development of the floor of the brain and voluntary muscles of the craniofacial region. The lateral plate mesoderm consists of the laryngeal cartilages (arytenoid and cricoid). The three tissue layers give rise to the pharyngeal apparatus, formed by six pairs of pharyngeal arches, a set of pharyngeal pouches and pharyngeal grooves, which are the most typical feature in development of the head and neck. The formation of each region of the face and neck is due to the migration of the neural crest cells which come from the ectoderm. These cells determine the future structure to develop in each pharyngeal arch. Eventually, they also form the neurectoderm, which forms the forebrain, midbrain and hindbrain, cartilage, bone, dentin, tendon, dermis, pia mater and arachnoid mater, sensory neurons, and glandular stroma.

== Pharyngeal arches ==
Pharyngeal arches are formed during the fourth week. Each arch consists of a mesenchymal tissue covered on the outside by ectoderm and on the inside by epithelium of endodermal origin. In human embryology, there are six arches which are separated by pharyngeal grooves externally and pharyngeal pouches internally. These arches contribute to the physical appearance of the embryo because they are the main components that build the face and neck. In addition, the muscular components of each arch have their own cranial nerve, and wherever the muscle cells migrate, they carry their nerve component with them. Plus, each arch has its own arterial component. When neural cells migrate to the arches and surround them, they begin to increase in size. The six pharyngeal arches give rise to much of the skeletal and muscular tissue in the head and neck region. When the embryo is 42 days old, the mesenchymal arches can be recognized with its corresponding cranial nerve.

The first pharyngeal arch forms maxillary and mandibular processes. It is innervated by the trigeminal nerve and molds muscles related to mastication such as temporal, masseter, medial, lateral, pterygoid bones, tensor palati, and tensor tympani. This arch originates maxillar and mandibular prominences, part of the temporal bone and Meckel's cartilage (malleus and incus) as skeletal structures. The second pharyngeal arch is innervated by the facial cranial nerve. Muscles that arise from the arch are those involved with facial expression and the posterior digastric muscle. Skeletal structures that originate here are the cervical sinus, Reichert cartilage (stape) the styloid process of the temporal bone, the lesser cornu and the hyoid bone. The third pharyngeal arch is innervated by glossopharyngeal nerve. It molds the stylopharyngeus muscle and forms the skeletal structures of the greater horn and lower portion of body hyoid bone. The fourth and sixth arches are innervated by the vagus cranial nerve. Both arches will fuse to form the laryngeal cartilages. The fifth cartilage does not appear to have any contribution to adult anatomy and disappears.

== Pharyngeal pouches ==
Pharyngeal pouches develop into future parts in face and head. The pouches penetrate the surrounding mesenchyme but do not establish communication with the pharyngeal grooves. They appear simultaneously with the development of the arches. The first pharyngeal pouch is characterized by narrowing at its final segment. However, it does not disappear and eventually forms the eustachian tube. Second pharyngeal pouch develops differently from the first one mainly because most of it disappears, leaving the tonsillar fossa (Rohen). At the end of the fifth month, the palatine tonsil as a protective structure is completed. This structure covers the tonsillar fossa. The third pharyngeal pouch will give rise to the inferior parathyroid gland and thymus. The fourth and fifth pouches develop as a unique structure that molds the superior parathyroid and parafollicular cells of thyroid gland.

== Pharyngeal grooves ==
Initially, pharyngeal grooves consist of four bars of mesenchymal tissue that separate pharyngeal nerves. Most of these structures obliterate, only the ear canal remains.

== Development of the tongue ==
In the fourth week of the pregnancy the structures that develop the tongue appear. These structures develop from the first pharyngeal arch are two lingual lateral prominences and one in the middle that does not develop and disappears. A second prominence, the hypobranchial eminence, comes from the second, third and fourth pharyngeal arches. A third prominence that comes from the fourth arch develops the epiglottis. The laryngeal orifice is behind the third prominence, which is surrounded by the arytenoid prominences. Later, the lateral and middle prominences join forming the first of the three parts of the tongue. The terminal sulcus is a V-shaped line that separates the body of the tongue from the posterior part. The corresponding nerve for the three prominences of the anterior tongue is the trigeminal nerve. The posterior tongue is innervated by the glossopharyngeal nerve. The muscles of the tongue are innervated by the hypoglossal nerve.

== Development of the thyroid ==
The thyroid appears as an epithelial proliferation in the pharynx floor between the copula linguae and the tuberculum impar. This point later will be the foramen cecum. Later, the thyroid descends in front of the pharyngeal gut when it already has a bilobed diverticulum shape. The thyroglossal duct keeps the thyroid joined to the tongue until it disappears. The thyroid keeps descending in front of the hyoid bone until finally it affixes to the front of the trachea in the seventh week. The thyroid starts working in the third month when the first follicles are visible and start producing colloid. The parafollicular cells come from the ultimobranchial body and produce calcitonin.

== Development of the face ==
The facial prominences are five swellings that appear in the fourth week and come from the first and second pharyngeal arch. They are basically made of mesenchyme that comes from the neural crest.

The frontonasal prominence is a single structure that is ventral to the forebrain. It is derived from neural crest cells, which have an ectodermal origin. These neural crest cells migrate from the ectoderm as the forebrain closes, invading the space that will form the frontonasal prominence. The maxillary and mandibular prominences are derived from the first arch. The maxillary prominence is initially located superior/lateral to the stomodeum while the mandibular prominence is located inferior to it and will fuse early on.

Nasal placodes originate on the frontonasal prominence from the ectoderm. They thicken and sink in to form Nasal Pits, which deepen to form the Nasal Sacs. At the same time, mesodermal cells proliferate around the placodes, and the sides of these swellings form the medial and lateral nasal prominences. The lateral nasal prominence is separated from the maxillary prominence by the nasolacrimal groove.

As the maxillary prominences continue growing they merge laterally with the mandibular prominences to form the cheeks. Their growth compresses the medial nasal prominences and causes them to fuse around the 10th week of development. This establishes the bridge of the nose and the intermaxillary segment, which is the region of the medial nasal prominence located inferior to the bridge of the nose and superior to the mandibular prominence. The intermaxillary segment yields the portion of the upper lip containing the philtrum, the upper jaw with 4 incisors, and the primary palate. The medial prominence fuses with the maxillary prominence, giving rise to a smooth upper lip while fusing the primary and secondary palate. Meanwhile, the lateral nasal prominence gives rise to the alae of the nose and fuses with the maxillary prominence, forming the Nasolacrimal duct. This duct is formed when the ectoderm thickens into a cord and sinks into the underlying mesenchyme.

== Development of the nasal cavity ==
The formation of the lateral and medial nasal prominences makes the nasal placodes lie in the floor of the depression, called nasal pits. The nasal pits deepen and develop the nasal sacs in the sixth week. These new structures grow dorsocaudally in front of the forming brain. In the beginning, the nasal sacs are separated from the oral cavity by the oronasal membrane. This membrane disappears in the seventh week leaving a connection between the nasal cavities and the oral cavity, called the primitive choanae. Later, when the development of the secondary palate occurs, the choanae changes its position and locates at the junction of the nasal cavity and the pharynx. The nasal septum grows as a downgrowth from the merged nasal prominences and fuses with the palatine process between the ninth and eleventh week. Finally, the superior, middle and inferior conchae develop the lateral wall of each nasal cavity.

== See also ==
- Cleft lip and palate
- First arch syndrome
