= Pharyngeal apparatus =

Embryological structure

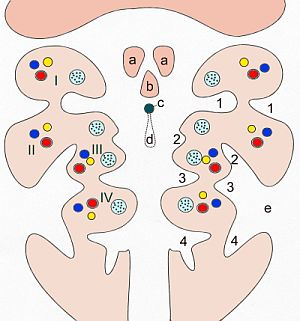
Pattern of the pharyngeal arches. I-IV pharyngeal arches, 1–4 pharyngeal pouches (inside) and/or pharyngeal grooves (outside) a Tuberculum laterale b Tuberculum impar c Foramen cecum d Ductus thyreoglossus e Sinus cervicalis

The pharyngeal apparatus is an embryological structure.

It consists of:

- pharyngeal grooves (from ectoderm)
- pharyngeal arches (from mesoderm)
- pharyngeal pouches (from endoderm)

and related membranes.
