= Premaxilla =

Cranial bones at front of upper jaw in many vertebrates

- Skull of Spinosaurus aegyptiacus, premaxilla in orange

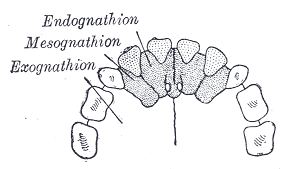
- Human premaxilla and its sutures

Details
- Precursor: Median nasal prominence

Identifiers
- TA98: A02.1.12.031
- TA2: 833
- FMA: 77231

The premaxilla (or praemaxilla) is one of a pair of small cranial bones at the very tip of the upper jaw of many vertebrates, usually, but not always, bearing teeth. In humans, they are fused with the maxilla. In therian mammals the premaxilla is also known as the incisive bone. Other terms used for this structure include premaxillary bone or os premaxillare, intermaxillary bone or os intermaxillare, and Goethe's bone.

== Human anatomy ==
Incisive bone
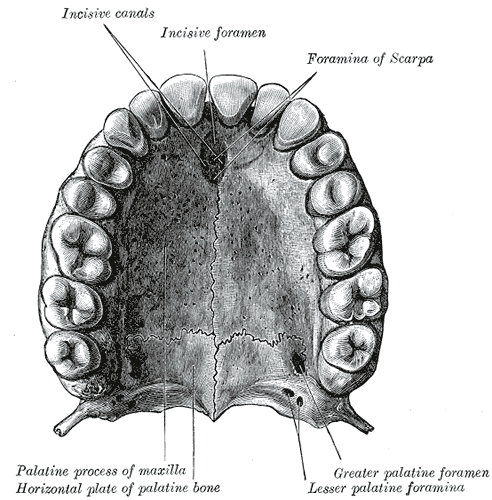
- The bony palate and alveolar arch. (Premaxilla is not labeled, but region is visible.)

Details

Identifiers
- Latin: os incisivum
- TA98: A02.1.12.031
- TA2: 833
- FMA: 77231

In human anatomy, the premaxilla is referred to as the incisive bone (os incisivum) and is the part of the maxilla which bears the incisor teeth, and encompasses the anterior nasal spine and alar region. In the nasal cavity, the premaxillary element projects higher than the maxillary element behind. The palatal portion of the premaxilla is a bony plate with a generally transverse orientation. The incisive foramen is bound anteriorly and laterally by the premaxilla and posteriorly by the palatine process of the maxilla.

It is formed from the fusion of a pair of small cranial bones at the very tip of the jaws of many animals, usually bearing teeth, but not always. They are connected to the maxilla and the nasals. While Johann Wolfgang von Goethe was not the first one to discover the incisive bone in humans, he was the first to prove its presence across mammals. Hence, the incisive bone is also known as Goethe's bone.

== Incisive bone and premaxilla ==
The term "incisive bone" is often used for the element in mammals, and it has been generally thought to be homologous to premaxilla in non-mammalian animals. This homology was challenged by Ernst Gaupp in 1905 and lent credence by a 2021 paper which found expression of marker proteins associated with the maxillary prominence in the mouse premaxilla. This led the authors to conclude that the incisive bone is a novel character first acquired in therian mammals as a composition of premaxilla derived from medial nasal prominence and septomaxilla derived from maxillary prominence. Under this hypothesis, only the palatine process corresponds to the premaxilla, while the other parts are the septomaxilla.

However, the proposal that the incisive and the premaxilla are not homologous has been criticised. A 2023 study pointed out that only a small subset of premaxillary cells expressed markers consistent with an origin from the maxillary prominence. Using different embryological methods that specifically highlighted cells of the nasofrontal ectomesenchyme, the study showed that the premaxilla originated from the nasal prominence, as in chicken embryos. This study further found expression of markers used in the 2021 study in the cells adjacent to the incisor tooth germs, but demonstrated that these cells originated from the nasal prominence.

== Embryology ==
In the embryo, the nasal region develops from neural crest cells which start their migration down to the face during the fourth week of gestation. A pair of symmetrical nasal placodes (thickenings in the epithelium) are each divided into medial and lateral processes by the nasal pits. The medial processes become the septum, philtrum, and premaxilla.

The first ossification centers in the area of the future premaxilla appear during the seventh week above the germ of the second incisor on the outer surface of the nasal capsule. After eleven weeks an accessory ossification center develops into the alar region of the premaxilla. Then a premaxillary process grow upwards to fuse with the frontal process of the maxilla; and later expands posteriorly to fuse with the alveolar process of the maxilla. The boundary between the premaxilla and the maxilla remains discernible after birth and a suture is often observable up to five years of age.

It is also common in non-mammals, such as chickens, that premaxilla is derived from medial nasal prominence. The premaxilla in mice has been argued to have a dual origin, with most of the bone covering the face originating from the maxillary prominence, and only a part of the palate originating from the medial nasal prominence. This has not been supported by further work showing that the mouse premaxilla develops entirely from the median nasal prominence.

In bilateral cleft lip and palate, the growth pattern of the premaxilla differs significantly from the normal case; in utero growth is excessive and directed more horizontally, resulting in a protrusive premaxilla at birth.

== Evolutionary variation ==
Forming the oral edge of the upper jaw in most jawed vertebrates, the premaxillary bones comprise only the central part in more primitive forms. They are fused in blowfishes and absent in cartilaginous fishes such as sturgeons.

Reptiles and most non-mammalian therapsids have a large, paired, intramembranous bone behind the premaxilla called the septomaxilla. Because this bone is vestigial in Acristatherium (a Cretaceous eutherian) this species is believed to be the oldest known therian mammal. Intriguingly the septomaxilla is present in monotremes.

Embryonic and fossil studies in 2021 initially suggested that the incisive bone, which has been called "premaxilla" in therian mammals, has been largely replaced by septomaxilla; and that only a palatal part of the incisive bone remains a vestige of premaxilla. Under this hypothesis, the bones that have been called "premaxilla" in therian mammals are not entirely homologous to the original premaxilla of other vertebrates. This hypothesis is, however, contested, and further embryological studies support the homology of the premaxilla of therians and other vertebrates.

The differences in the size and composition in the premaxilla of various families of bats is used for classification.

The premaxillae of squamates are fused; this feature can be used to distinguish fossil squamates from relatives.

=== Os paradoxum ===
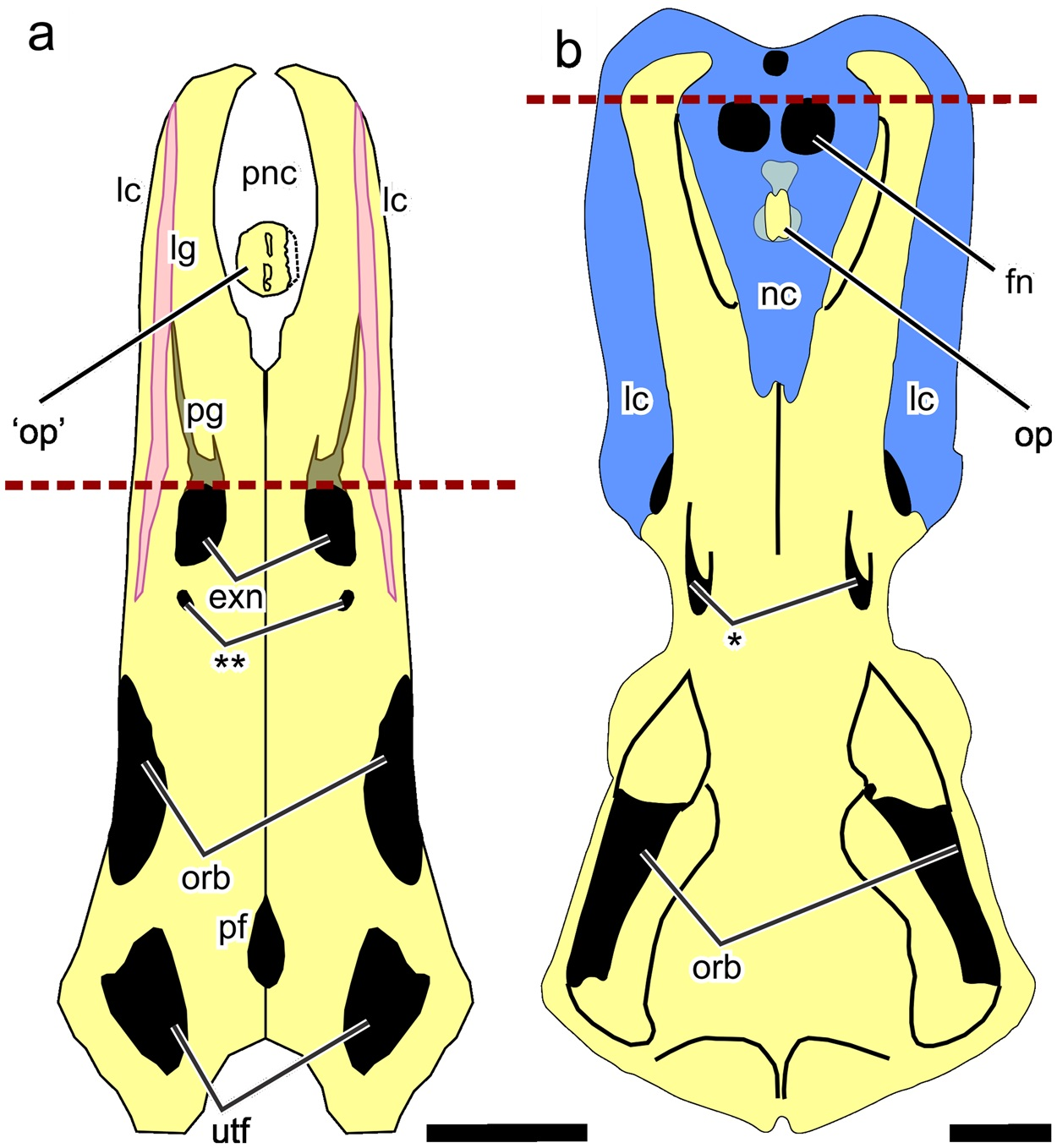
The os paradoxum of the platypus (right) and Eretmorhipis (left).

In the platypus, a unique dumbbell-shaped bone known as the os paradoxum is present in the snout. Historically, the homology of this bone has been a source of debate. It was first described by Johann Friedrich Meckel in 1826, who considered it a part of the premaxilla; Richard Owen disagreed, considering it a neomorphic element similar to the prenasal of pigs; later, Robert Broom proposed that it was homologous to the paired reptilian vomers (his "prevomers"). Developmental evidence demonstrates that the os paradoxum develops as the palatal process of the premaxilla, connected by a thin thread of bone that is later resorbed during ontogeny, leaving the element isolated. The os paradoxum supports the paraseptal cartilage.

A similar bone is present in the superficially platypus-like hupehsuchian Eretmorhipis, which convergently evolved a platypus-like snout. This element is not believed to share a function with that of the platypus.

== History ==
In 1573, Volcher Coiter was the first to illustrate the incisive suture in humans. Pierre Marie Auguste Broussonet and Félix Vicq-d'Azyr were the first to describe the incisive bone as a separate bone within the skull in 1779 and 1780, respectively.

In the 1780s, Johann Wolfgang von Goethe began studying zoology, and formed the impression that all animals are similar, being bodies composed of vertebrae and their permutations. Under this hypothesis, the human skull is one example of a metamorphosed vertebra, and within it, the intermaxillary bone rests as evidence linking the species to other animals. With the exception of the basioccipital, exoccipitals, and supraoccipital, the vertebral origin of the skull is not currently supported by paleontological or developmental evidence. Goethe erroneously believed that he (together with Justus Christian Loder) had discovered the premaxilla.
