= Cervical thymic cyst =

Fluid-filled mass that can occur in the neck

A cervical thymic cyst, also called thymopharyngeal duct cyst, is a fluid-filled mass that occurs when the thymopharyngeal duct, an embryonic structure connecting the nascent thymus with the embryonic pharynx, fails to close and disappear. A thymic cyst is typically a solitary mass on one side of the neck, and is usually found near the carotid sheath. Some cervical thymic cysts may extend into the mediastinum. It is usually asymptomatic. The diagnostic process includes differentiating between other causes of neck masses in infants and children, including branchial cleft cysts and cystic hygromas. The treatment is surgical excision. On histologic examination, the wall of the cyst includes thymic tissue, and may include parathyroid gland tissue because of the parathyroid gland's common embryonic origin with the thymus gland in the third pharyngeal pouch. Fewer than 100 cases of cervical thymic cysts have been reported in the medical literature.

== Pathogenesis ==
Thymus is a lymphoid organ that develops from the 3rd and 4th pharyngeal pouches.

While the pathogenesis of cervical thymus cyst is still unclear, there are two main mechanisms by which this lesion occurs:

1. Congenital: During the fetal development, the thymus forms from the third branchial pouch which descends lateral to the mediastinum toward the thyroid gland. A remnant of this thymic tissue can persist during its descent through the thymopharyngeal duct, and later on become the cause of the lesion. This mechanism has been better supported by the authorities.
2. Acquired: The thymic tissue, mainly the Hassall corpuscles and epithelium reticulum, progressively degenerates and ascends upward to cause the lesion.

== Clinical Features ==
Cervical thymic cyst is a very rare pathology that is often incidentally found due to its asymptomatic nature. The patient usually notices a neck mass that grows slowly which triggers them to see a clinician and be admitted to the hospital. However, it can cause symptoms as it grows in size and compresses on other organs. These symptoms include difficulty breathing, difficulty swallowing, hoarseness of voice, among others. It causes neck swelling. Males are more commonly affected. Most cases occur in the first decade of life, as the thymus tends to atrophy after puberty. This lesion usually affects the left side of the neck.

The cyst can be small as 1 cm and as large as 26 cm. The location can vary as well, from the angle of the mandible to as low as the mediastinum.

== Diagnosis ==
=== Differential diagnosis ===
Differential diagnosis include other more common cervical masses, such as branchial cyst, lymphatic malformations, dermoid-epidermoid cyst.

This lesion is usually not diagnosed before surgery. Pathology must be obtained for an accurate diagnosis.

=== Imaging ===
Ultrasound is used as the first imaging modality, and often shows hypo-echoic, sometimes septated cyst that runs along the sternocleidomastoid muscle.

Other imaging techniques such as CT and MRI can also be used. These are more useful for determining the cyst's relationship to the surrounding structures and planning for the surgery.

The cyst may be uni- or multi-loculated.

== Pathology ==
The wall of the cyst can have multiple array of pathology. It may have single layered squamous cell to multiple layers of stratified cells. Sometimes the sample includes thyroid or parathyroid tissue. This is thought to be due to the common embryologic origin of thymus and thyroid and parathyroid cells.

The cyst itself contains brown colored fluid.

== Treatment ==
Surgery is often the treatment of choice for a complete resection through VATS (Video-assisted thoracoscopic surgery). Because there are important structures surrounding the cyst, such as the carotid sheath, recurrent laryngeal nerve, glossopharyngeal nerve, hypoglossal nerve, and phrenic nerve, the location of the cyst should be carefully established before the operation.

While local resection is usually adequate, thymectomy may be required if there's a suspicion for thymoma or when the cyst is multilocular.

The prognosis for this type of cyst is considered good. Recurrence is very rare in the post-operative period.
