= Lingual swelling =

Lingual swelling may refer to:

- Lateral lingual swelling
- Tuberculum impar, also known as median lingual swelling
