= Pseudo-goitre =

Apparent fullness of the front of the neck

Pseudo-goitre is the apparent fullness of the front part of the neck. It may be mistakenly diagnosed as thyroid enlargement. The cause for pseudogoitre can be fat tissue of the neck, cervical lordosis, cervical masses (such as cervical lymphadenopathy, branchial cleft cyst, pharyngeal diverticulum) or high lying thyroid or trachea. Pseudogoitre due to cervical lordosis (swan shaped-neck) is called Modigliani syndrome after the artist Amedeo Modigliani, who was famous for painting women with exaggerated curved neck. Pseudogoitre can be distinguished from other disease conditions of the neck by physical examination. Normal thyroid moves up with swallowing, and any structure attached to the thyroid such as a true goitre, also moves along with thyroid. A pseudogoitre is unlikely if the area of fullness moves with swallowing. If pseudogoitre is due to cervical lordosis, the fullness disappears on straightening of the neck. A high-lying thyroid can be excluded by palpation. If the diagnosis is uncertain after clinical examination, an ultrasonogram is taken to rule out pathology of the neck.
