= VTPP 652 Pax-6 =

Pax-6, member of the Pax gene class, is responsible for carrying the genetic information that will encode Pax-6 (protein) which dictates the development of the olfactory epithelium, eyes and central nervous system in vertebrates. Pax-6 is expressed as a transcription factor when neural ectoderm receives a combination of weak sonic hedgehog and a strong TGF-Beta signaling gradients. Expression is first seen in the forebrain, hindbrain, head ectoderm and spinal cord followed by later expression in midbrain. Expression in the head ectoderm will give rise to the nasal placodes and to the eye placodes. The nasal placodes will give rise to the olfactory epithelium while eye placodes give rise to the lens and cornea. Expression in the different brain regions is orchestrated with the combinatorial expression of other transcription factors to give rise to the central nervous system. Experiments in mice demonstrate that a deficiency in Pax-6 leads to decrease in brain size, brain structure abnormality leading to Autism, lack of iris formation or a thin cornea. Knockout experiments produced eyeless phenotypes reinforcing the gene's role in eye development. Advancing research in this area may lead us to better understanding of the complexity seen in neural development and maybe one day be able to grow eye tissue in vitro.
