= Picibanil =

Drug used to treat lymphatic disorder

Picibanil also called OK - 432, is a mixture of group A streptococcus with anti-neoplastic properties used in treatment of cystic hygroma (lymphangiomas).

== Bibliography ==
- Rachel Airley (2009). Cancer chemotherapy. Wiley-Blackwell. ISBN 978-0-470-09254-5.
- Wood, Miriam; David Brighton (2005). The Royal Marsden Hospital handbook of cancer chemotherapy: a guide for the multidisciplinary team. St. Louis, Mo: Elsevier Churchill Livingstone. ISBN 978-0-443-07101-0.
- Fergus Macbeth; Hanna, Louise; Crosby, Tom (2008). Practical clinical oncology. Cambridge, UK: Cambridge University Press.
- Perry, Michael J. (2008). The Chemotherapy source book. Philadelphia: Wolters Kluwer Health/Lippincott Williams & Wilkins.
- Faguet GB (2005). The War on Cancer. Springer. p. 71. ISBN 978-1-4020-3618-7.
- Hirsch J (Sep 2006). "An anniversary for cancer chemotherapy". JAMA. 296 (12): 1518–20. doi:10.1001/jama.296.12.1518. PMID 17003400.
- Huang ES (2000). Internal medicine: handbook for clinicians, resident survival guide. Arlington, VA: Scrub Hill Press. p. 130. ISBN 978-0-9645467-5-2.
- Hoskins, William J.; Al, Et (2005). William J. Hoskins; Carlos A. Perez; Robert C. Young; Richard R. Barakat; Maurie Markman; Marcus E. (eds.). Principles and Practice of Gynecologic Oncology (4. ed.). Philadelphia: Lippincott Williams & Wilkins. pp. 93–94. ISBN 978-0-7817-4689-2.
