= Persistent thyroglossal duct =

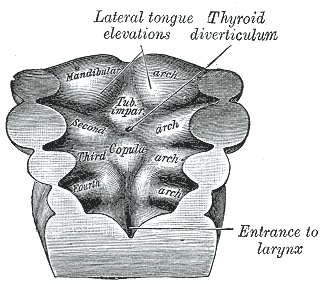
- Origin of Thyroglossal duct (Thyroid diverticulum)
- Specialty: Medical genetics

A persistent thyroglossal duct is a usually benign medical condition in which the thyroglossal duct, a structure usually only found during embryonic development, fails to atrophy. The duct persists as a midline structure forming an open connection between the back of the tongue and the thyroid gland. This opening can lead to fluid accumulation and infection, which necessitate the removal of the duct.

== Signs and symptoms ==
Studies done on cadavers claim persistent thyroglossal ducts can be completely asymptomatic and found in 7% of the human adult population. However, the continued presence of the duct can often lead to complications due to infections and fluid buildup. The glands in the mucosa of the duct will continue their secretions until the fluid forms a cyst or exit the duct via the opening in the foramen cecum. Local infections, such as colds, tonsillitis, or inflammation of the lymph nodes in the area can also lead to the accumulation of fluid within the duct. Even if the cyst forms as secondary to another infection and improved after antibiotics, it will often reoccur and require treatment.

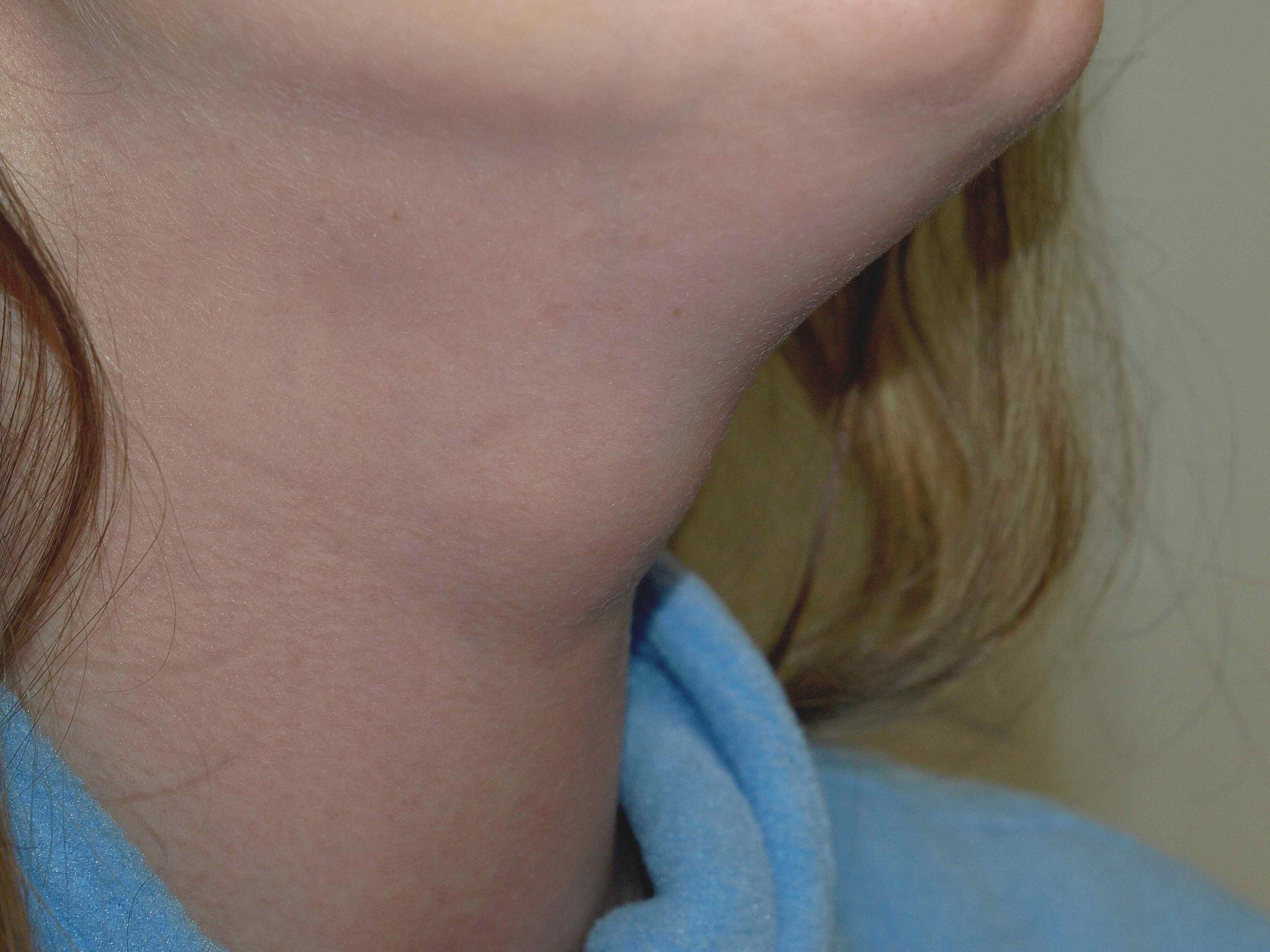
Example of Thyroglossal duct cyst.

Three-fourths of abnormalities within a persistent thyroglossal duct involve the formation of a cyst. If a persistent thyroglossal duct becomes fluid filled it will form a thyroglossal duct cyst, which accounts for 70% of congenital neck masses and is the most likely diagnosis if the mass is along the midline of the neck. These cysts are often diagnosed in children under the age of ten and have no particular gender prevalence. The cysts are normally asymptomatic at this age and are noticed because of the swelling that will move if the patient swallows. Over 80% of these cysts are located at or below the hyoid bone.

Very rarely, the persistent duct can become cancerous, called thyroglossal duct carcinoma. In the case of thyroglossal duct carcinoma, the cancerous cells are ectopic thyroid tissue that has been deposited along the thyroglossal duct and will present as a papillary carcinoma. However, the cells are less likely to metastasize in the cyst, than if they were present in the actual thyroid gland.

The other fourth of abnormalities presents as draining abscess. This is from an infection that will rupture through the skin to allow for adequate drainage of the infected area.

== Anatomy ==
The tongue develops after the thyroid primordium so the foramen cecum becomes buried at the base of the tongue. The thyroglossal duct then continues through the neck and lies anterior to the laryngeal cartilage. The duct then passes anteriorly to the developing hyoid bone; however, as the bone continues to grow it can continue to grow posteriorly, become anterior, or even grow to surround the duct. The duct is found very close to the medial line of the neck. The duct continues in front of the thyrohyoid membrane, sternothyroid muscle, and sternohyoid muscle, before terminating in the inferior segment of the neck at the thyroid.

Failures of duct removal surgeries have proven that the suprahyoid region of the duct can have many microscopic branches that connect to the base of the tongue. They exhibit variability between different cases; however, it is believed they are associated with the pharyngeal mucosa and muscles of the tongue.

=== Embryological origin ===
During the third week of development, the thyroid gland begins to develop from the floor of the pharynx. This primordium begins as an evagination between the first and second pharyngeal grooves, relatively where the anterior two-thirds of the tongue ends. This area is known as the foramen cecum and marks the origin of the thyroglossal duct. As the developing thyroid begins to travel to its intended destination, it remains connected to the tongue via the thyroglossal duct. By the seventh week of fetal development, the thyroid reaches its final position in the neck after growing through the mesoderm and musculature of the tongue, mouth, and neck. During the eighth to tenth week, the cells of the duct normally begin growing inwards and fill the previously hollow tube, beginning from the inferior end. This inferior end of the duct will then become the pyramidal lobe of the thyroid gland. The dividing cellular cords of the tubular duct become the isthmus and lateral lobes of the gland to complete the formation of the rest of the gland.

Once the thyroglossal duct involutes, the cells will begin to degenerate and disappear. However, in the case of a persistent thyroglossal duct, the tube remains hollow and continues to connect the foramen cecum to the thyroid gland.

== Histology ==
The cells of the thyroglossal duct are epithelial in origin. The cell shapes can range from columnar, to squamous, to transitional epithelium. Thyroid-like masses can also be seen in close relation along the duct. Enclosed vesicles and cysts can also be seen while studying the tissue of the duct. A persistent thyroglossal duct in a rabbit showed resemblance to the layout of the alimentary canal; with its external fibrous connective tissue, muscular layers, submucosal glands, and convoluted epithelium.

== Diagnosis ==
Ultrasound is the often chosen to examine the duct and determine the presence and size of any cysts or abnormalities. Fine-needle aspiration cytology can also be used to confirm the diagnosis.

== Treatment ==
In order to prevent further cysts and infections from forming, the thyroglossal duct and all of its branches are removed from the throat and neck area. A procedure, known as the Sistrunk procedure, is considered to be the standard procedure and involves removal of portions of the hyoid bone and core tissue of the suprahyoid region. Cysts will often reoccur if the entire duct is not removed, so reoccurrence requires a wider range of tissue to be removed in a subsequent surgery.

Delaying the surgical procedure almost always leads to recurrent infections, which will continue to delay the needed treatment. The Sistrunk procedure has a reoccurrence rate of less than 5%, proving it is extremely effective at removing the majority of traces of the persistent thyroglossal duct.
