= Collaural fistula =

- Other names: Cervico-aural fistula

Collaural fistula or cervico-aural fistula is a type of fistula whose openings are at external auditory canal and the neck, usually in the upper part of anterior border of sternocleidomastoid muscle. It occurs at birth because the defect is in the embryological branchial cleft. It is rare, and accounts for 8% of the branchial cleft anomalies, which is why it is sometimes misdiagnosed.

== Diagnosis ==
The patient presents with non-healing ulcers of the neck and one of the external auditory canals. Diagnosis is confirmed by injecting methylene blue dye into the neck opening, and dye coming out of the opening in the external auditory canal. Computerized tomography fistulogram can yield more accurate results regarding the course of the fistula.

== Treatment ==
Treatment of collaural fistula is done by surgical exploration and excision. The fistulous track is removed with skin and cartilage. Split thickness skin grafting and stenting is done if more than 30% of the external canal's circumference has been removed. The potential complications following fistula removal surgery are facial nerve paralysis and recurrence.
