= Thyroglossal cyst =

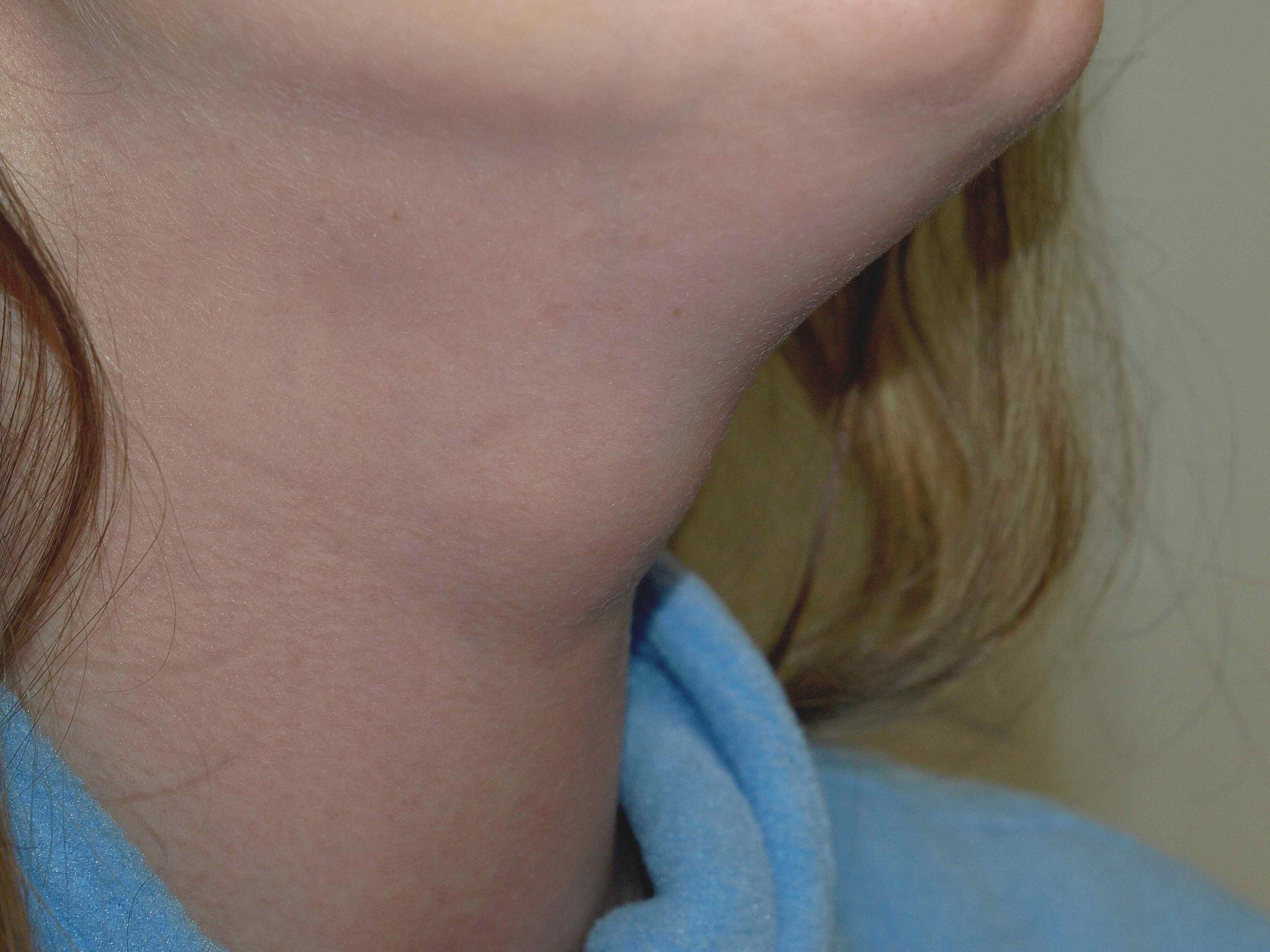
- Thyroglossal cyst
- Specialty: Medical genetics

A thyroglossal cyst or thyroglossal duct cyst is a fibrous cyst that forms from a persistent thyroglossal duct. Thyroglossal cysts can be defined as an irregular neck mass or a lump which develops from cells and tissues left over after the formation of the thyroid gland during developmental stages.

Thyroglossal cysts are the most common cause of midline neck masses and are generally located caudal to (below) the hyoid bone. These neck masses can occur anywhere along the path of the thyroglossal duct, from the base of the tongue to the suprasternal notch. Other common causes of midline neck masses include lymphadenopathy, dermoid cysts, and various tooth development anomalies.

Thyroglossal cysts develop at birth. Many diagnostic procedures may be used to establish the degree of the cyst.

== Signs and symptoms ==
Thyroglossal duct cysts most often present with a palpable asymptomatic midline neck mass usually below [65% of the time] the level of the hyoid bone. The mass on the neck moves during swallowing or on protrusion of the tongue because of its attachment to the tongue via the tract of thyroid descent. Some patients will have neck or throat pain, or dysphagia.

The persistent duct or sinus can promote oral secretions, which may cause cysts to become infected. Up to half of thyroglossal cysts are not diagnosed until adult life. The tract can lie dormant for years or even decades, until some kind of stimulus leads to cystic dilation. Infection can sometimes cause the transient appearance of a mass or enlargement of the cyst, at times with periodic recurrences. Spontaneous drainage may also occur. Differential diagnosis are ectopic thyroid, enlarged lymph nodes, dermoid cysts and goiter.

Thyroglossal cyst usually presents as a midline neck lump (in the region of the hyoid bone) that is usually painless, smooth and cystic, though if infected, pain can occur. There may be difficulty breathing, dysphagia (difficulty swallowing), or dyspepsia (discomfort in the upper abdomen), especially if the cyst becomes large.

The most common location for a thyroglossal cyst is midline or slightly off midline, between the isthmus of the thyroid and the hyoid bone or just above the hyoid bone. A thyroglossal cyst can develop anywhere along a thyroglossal duct, though cysts within the tongue or in the floor of the mouth are rare.A thyroglossal cyst will move upwards with protrusion of the tongue.Thyroglossal cysts are associated with an increased incidence of ectopic thyroid tissue. Occasionally, a lingual thyroid can be seen as a flattened strawberry-like lump at the base of the tongue.

=== Complications ===
==== Infection ====
An infected thyroglossal duct cyst can occur when it is left untreated for a certain amount of time or simply when a thyroglossal duct cyst hasn't been suspected. The degree of infection can be examined as major rim enhancement has occurred, located inferior to the hyoid bone. Soft tissue swelling occurs, along with airway obstruction and trouble swallowing, due to the rapid enlargement of the cyst. With infections, there can be rare cases where an expression of fluid is projected into the pharynx causing other problems within the neck.

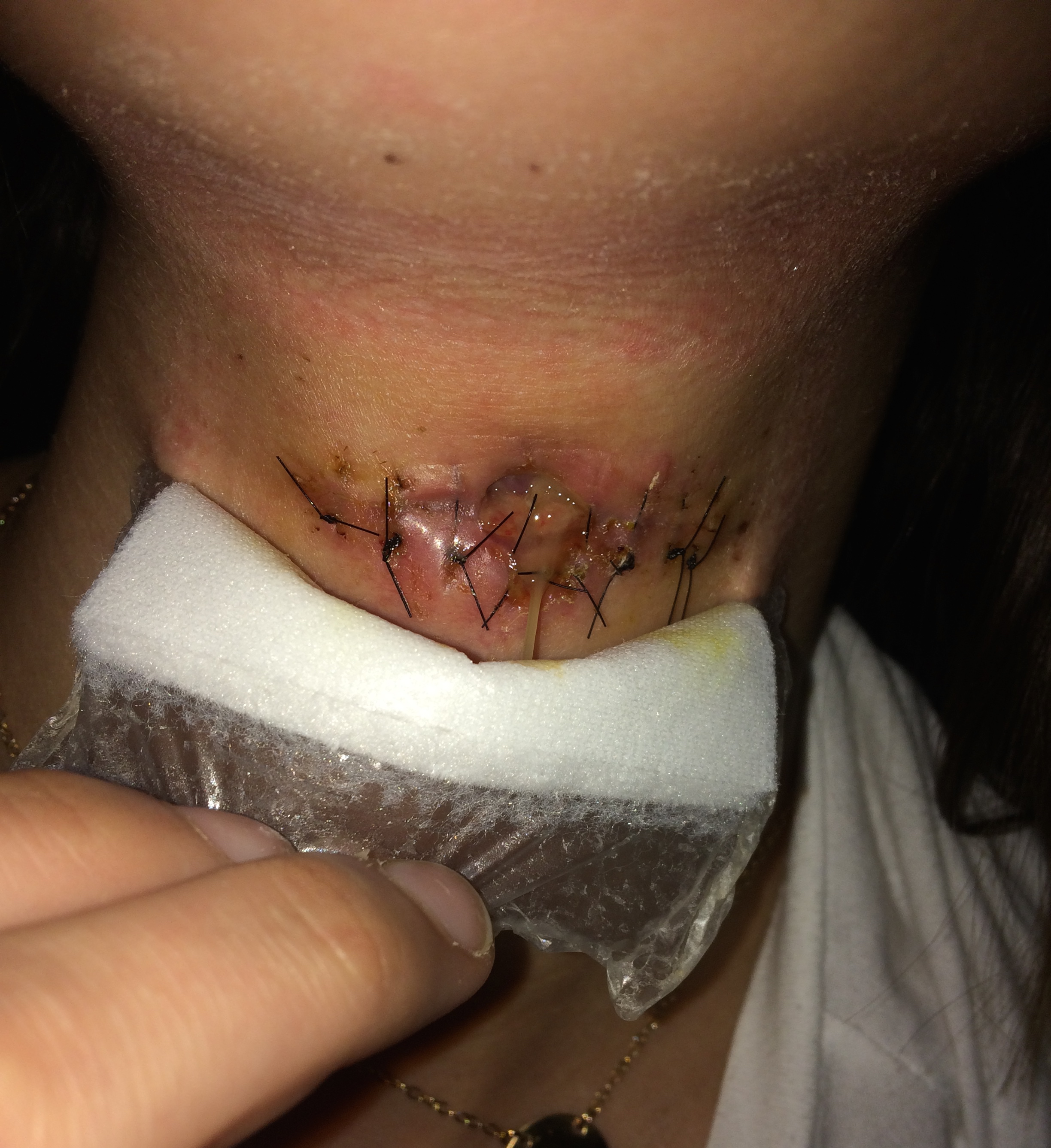
Post surgery infection on a Thyroglossal Cyst, reaction from stitches

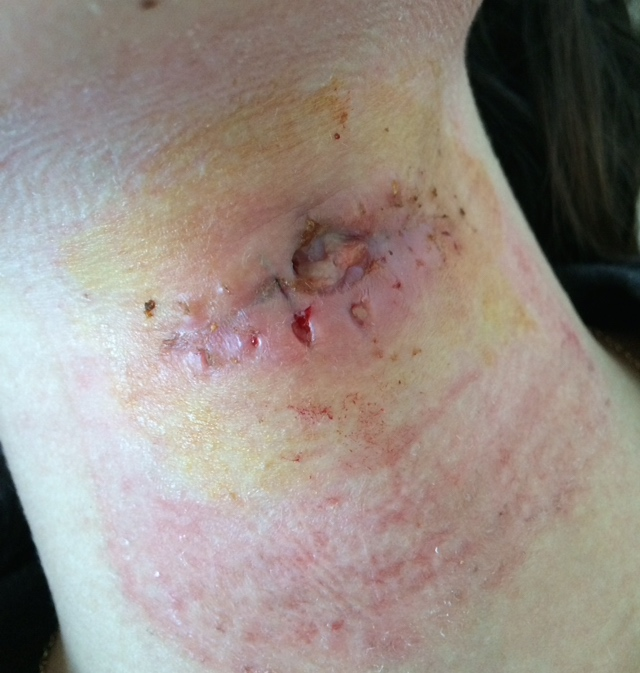
Post removal of stitches from surgery on a Thyroglossal Cyst infection

==== Thyroglossal fistula ====
A thyroglossal duct cyst may rupture unexpectedly, resulting in a draining sinus known as a thyroglossal fistula. Thyroglossal fistula can develop when the removal of the cyst has not been fully completed. This is usually noticed when bleeding in the neck occurs, causing swelling and fluid ejection around the original wound of removal.

==== Thyroglossal duct cyst carcinoma ====
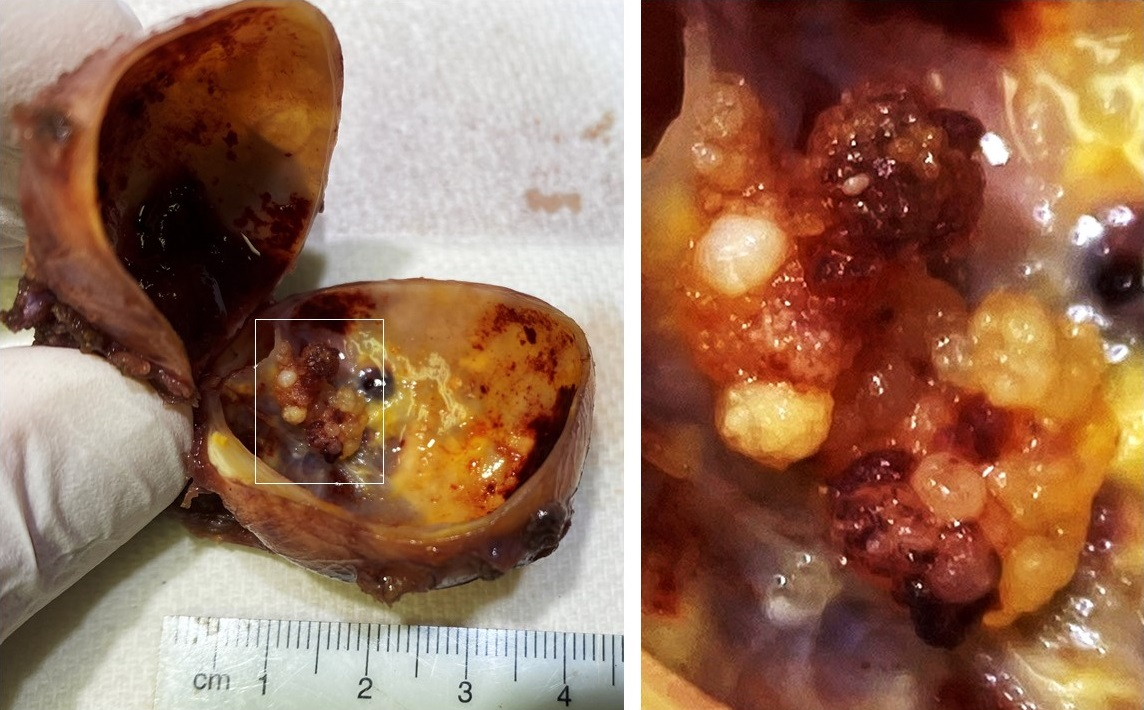
Thyroglossal cyst with papillary excrescences (magnified at right), where microscopy showed papillary thyroid cancer

Rarely (in less than 1% of cases), cancer may be present in a thyroglossal duct cyst. These tumors are generally papillary thyroid carcinomas, arising from the ectopic thyroid tissue within the cyst.

== Causes ==
Thyroglossal duct cysts are a birth defect. During embryonic development, the thyroid gland is being formed, beginning at the base of the tongue and moving towards the neck canal, known as the thyroglossal duct. Once the thyroid reaches its final position in the neck, the duct normally disappears. In some individuals, portions of the duct remain behind, leaving small pockets, known as cysts. During a person's life, these cyst pockets can fill with fluids and mucus, enlarging when infected, presenting the thyroglossal cyst.

== Embryology ==
The thyroglossal tract arises from the foramen cecum at the junction of the anterior two-thirds and posterior one-third of the tongue. Any part of the tract can persist, causing a sinus, fistula or cyst. Most fistulae are acquired following rupture or incision of the infected thyroglossal cyst. A thyroglossal cyst is lined by pseudostratified, ciliated columnar epithelium while a thyroglossal fistula is lined by columnar epithelium.

== Diagnosis ==
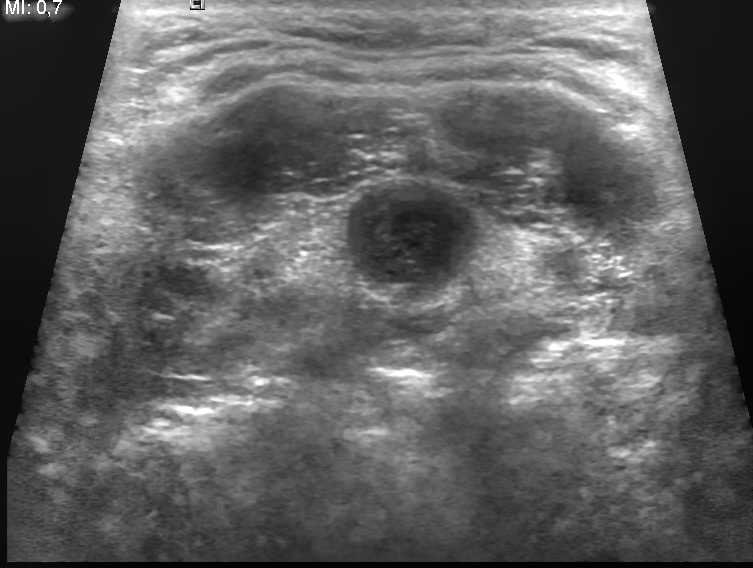
Ultrasound image of thyroglossal duct cyst

Diagnosis of a thyroglossal duct cyst requires a medical professional, and is usually done by a physical examination. It is important to identify whether or not the thyroglossal cyst contains any thyroid tissue, as it can define the degree of cyst that is being dealt with.

Diagnostic procedures for a thyroglossal cyst include:

Type	Definition
Blood test	Blood testing of thyroid function.
Ultrasound	Image capture of the degree of mass and its surrounding tissues.
Thyroid scan	Radioactive iodine or technetium (a radioactive metallic element) is used in this procedure to show any abnormalities of the thyroid.
Fine-needle aspiration	The removal of cells for biopsy, using a needle.

=== Clinical features ===
Clinical features can be found in the subhyoid portion of the tract and 75% present as midline swellings. The remainder can be found as far lateral as the lateral tip of the hyoid bone.

Typically, the cyst will move upwards on protrusion of the tongue, given its attachment to the embryonic duct, as well as on swallowing, due to attachment of the tract to the foramen caecum.

== Treatment ==
Although generally benign, the cyst must be removed if the patient exhibits difficulty in breathing or swallowing, or if the cyst is infected. Even if these symptoms are not present, the cyst may be removed to eliminate the chance of infection or development of a carcinoma,

Thyroid scans and thyroid function studies are often ordered preoperatively; this is important to demonstrate that normally functioning thyroid tissue is in its usual area. An ultrasound of the neck is both inexpensive and effective; CT scans or magnetic resonance imaging are also useful, but not routinely indicated.

Surgical management options include the Sistrunk procedure, en bloc central neck dissection, suture-guided transhyoid pharyngotomy, and Koempel's supra-hyoid technique. Cystectomy is an inadequate approach.

=== Sistrunk procedure ===
The Sistrunk procedure, first described in 1920, is the surgical resection of the central portion of the hyoid bone along with a wide core of tissue from the midline area between the hyoid and foramen cecum. It involves excision not only of the cyst but also of the path's tract and branches, and removal of the central portion of the hyoid bone is indicated to ensure complete removal of the tract. The original papers by Walter Sistrunk (the "classic" procedure described in 1920, and the "modified" procedure described in 1928) are available on-line with a modern commentary.

In general, the procedure consists of three steps:

1. incision
2. resection of cyst and hyoid bone
3. drainage and closure

There are several versions of the Sistrunk procedure, including:

- "classic": excision of the center of the hyoid bone along with a thyroglossal duct cyst, removal of one-eighth inch diameter core of tongue muscle superior to the hyoid at a 45-degree angle up to the foramen cecum to include mucosa, removal of one-quarter inch of the center of the hyoid bone, closure of the cut ends of the hyoid bone, and placement of a drain.
- modified: dissection through the tongue base but not through the mucosa. The modified Sistrunk procedure is the procedure of choice in both primary and revision cases.
- hyoid cartilage division: In cases without mature ossification of the hyoid bone, the non-fused cartilage portion can be divided by monopolar Bovie electro-cauterization or scissors. There were no statistical differences between this modified Sistrunk and the conventional Sistrunk procedure.

The procedure is relatively safe. In a study of 35 pediatric patients, Maddalozzo et al. found no major complications, but did observe minor complications (6 patients presented with seroma and 4 patients with local wound infections). A more recent paper analyzed 24 research studies on different treatment complications of thyroglossal cyst, and reported a total minor complications rate of 6% for the Sistrunk operation (classical or modified) and simple cystectomy treatment modalities. The Sistrunk procedure also showed better outcomes concerning the rate of overall recurrence, i.e. has the lowest rate of recurrence.

The Sistrunk procedure results in a 95% cure rate and 95–100% long-term survival.

== Epidemiology ==
1. 90% of cases are presented in children before the age of 10
2. 70% of neck anomalies are from thyroglossal cysts
3. Thyroglossal duct cysts are the second most common neck abnormalities after lymphadenopathy
4. A person can live with a thyroglossal duct cyst without any problems, until a pathology develops.
5. Approximately 7% of the population has thyroglossal duct remnants.
6. Thyroglossal duct carcinoma occurs in approximately 1 to 2% of thyroglossal cyst cases.

== See also ==
- Cutaneous columnar cyst
- Branchial cleft cyst
- Cystic hygroma
- Preauricular sinus and cyst
- Ranula
