= Cervical sinus =

Embryonic structure

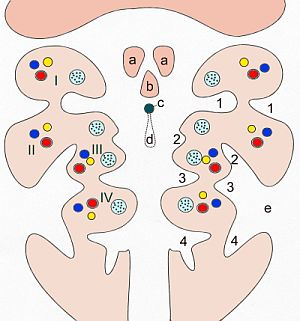
- Scheme of the pharyngeal arches I–IV: pharyngeal arches 1–4: pharyngeal pouches (inside) and/or pharyngeal grooves (outside) a: Tuberculum laterale b: Tuberculum impar c: Foramen cecum d: Ductus thyreoglossus e: Sinus cervicalis

Details

Identifiers
- Latin: sinus cervicalis

The cervical sinus is a structure formed during embryonic development, homologous to the gill cavity of the teleost fish. It is a deep depression found on each side of the neck. It is formed as the second pharyngeal arch (hyoid arch) grows faster than the other pharyngeal arches, so they become covered, by the homology of the operculum (fish). The first pharyngeal arch (mandibular arch) also grows slightly faster. It may fail to obliterate, forming a branchial cleft cyst or fistula, which is prone to infection.

== Structure ==
The cervical sinus is bounded in front by the second pharyngeal arch (hyoid arch), and behind by the thoracic wall. The second pharyngeal arch (hyoid arch) grows faster than the other pharyngeal arches, so they become covered. It is ultimately obliterated by the fusion of its walls by the 7th week of gestation.

== Clinical significance ==
Sometimes, the cervical sinus can fail to obliterate and thus remains as a branchial cleft cyst. The second pharyngeal arch may also not grow over the lower pharyngeal arches. This may be found anterior to the sternocleidomastoid muscle. It can also communicate with the skin as an external cervical fistula or with the pharynx as an internal cervical fistula. It is prone to infection. Medical ultrasound may be used to diagnose them.

== Additional images ==
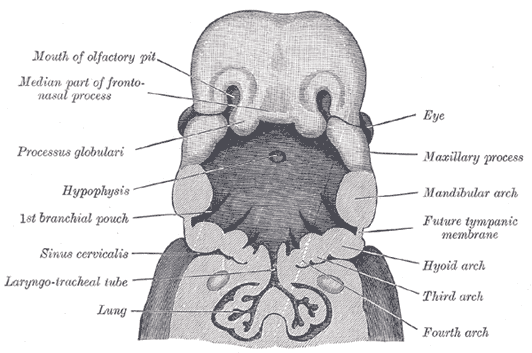
The head and neck of a human embryo 32 days old, seen from the ventral surface
