= Buccopharyngeal membrane =

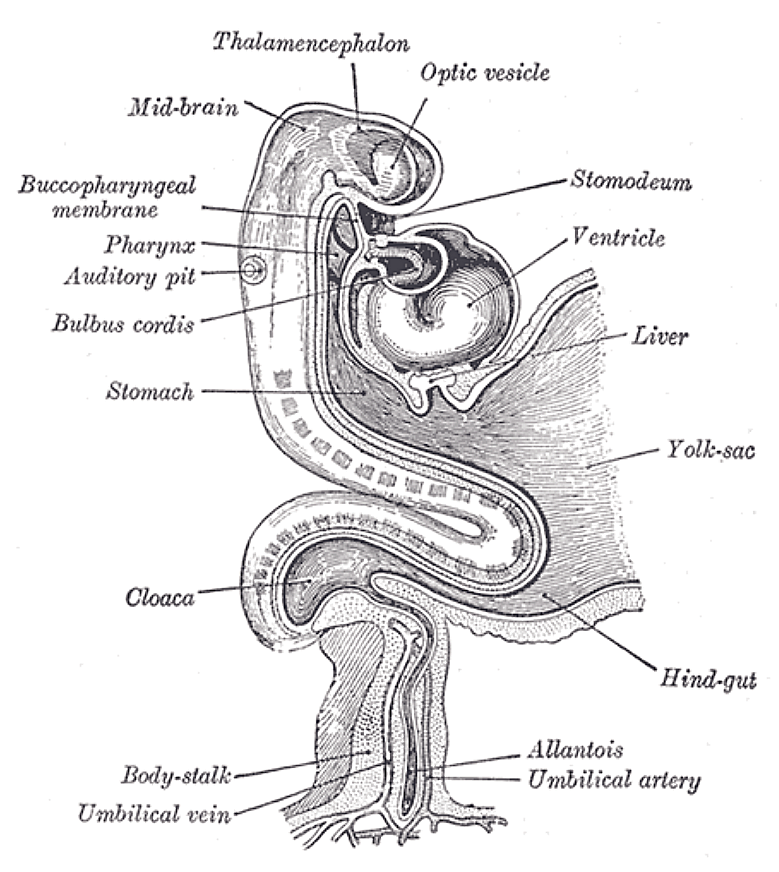
- Human embryo about twenty-five days old. Brain and heart represented from right side. Digestive tube and yolk sac in median section. Oropharyngeal membrane labeled in upper left.

Details

Identifiers
- Latin: membrana buccopharyngea

The region where the crescentic masses of the ectoderm and endoderm come into direct contact with each other constitutes a thin membrane, the buccopharyngeal membrane (or oropharyngeal membrane), which forms a septum between the primitive mouth and pharynx. In front of the buccopharyngeal area, where the lateral crescents of mesoderm fuse in the middle line, the pericardium is afterward developed, and this region is therefore designated the pericardial area.

The buccopharyngeal membranes serve as a respiratory surface in a wide variety of amphibians and reptiles. In this type of respiration, membranes in the mouth and throat are permeable to oxygen and carbon dioxide. In some species that remain submerged in water for long periods, gas exchange by this route can be significant.
