= Philtrum =

Vertical groove in the middle area of the upper lip

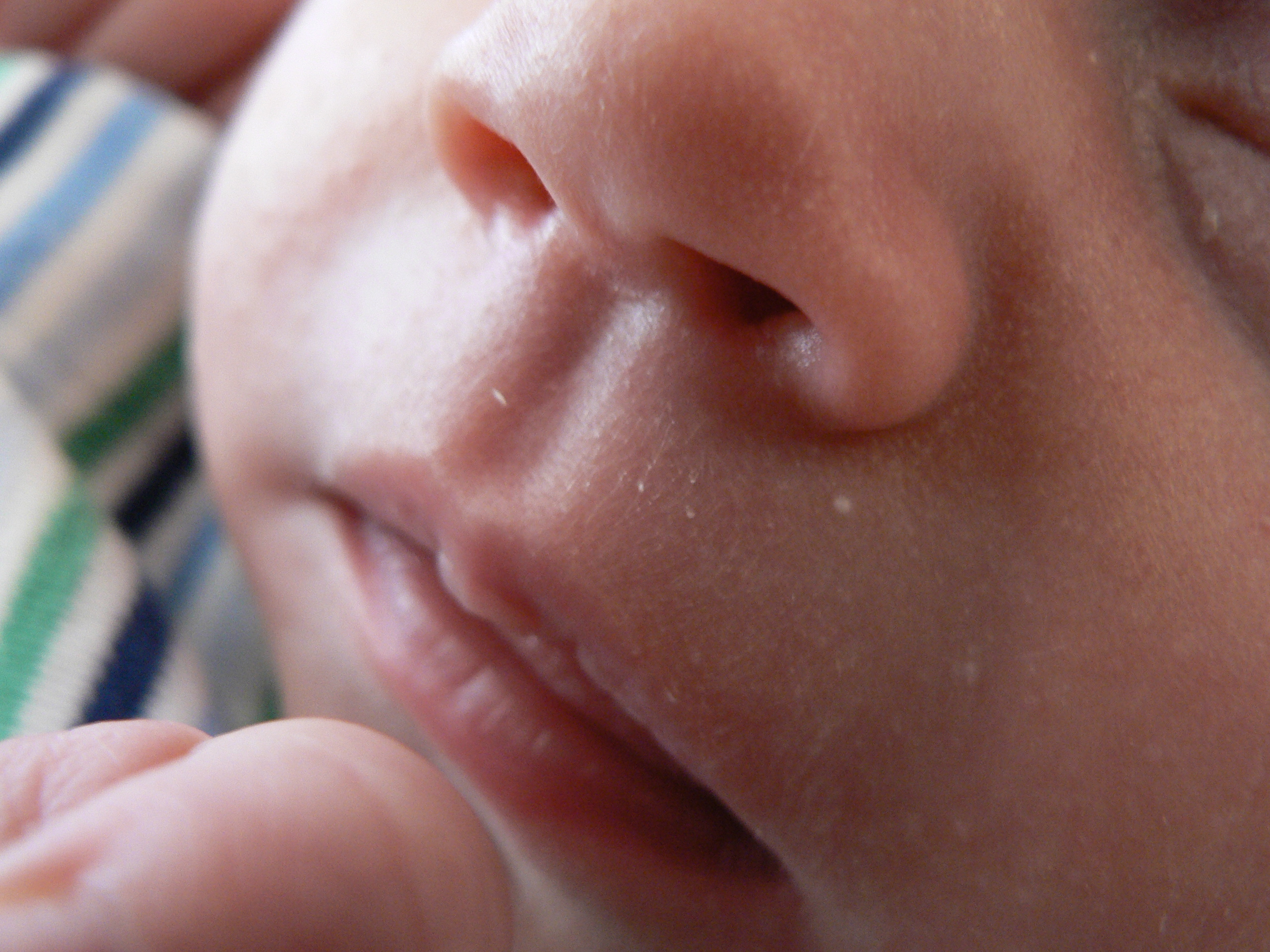
- Philtrum of a healthy, one-month-old baby

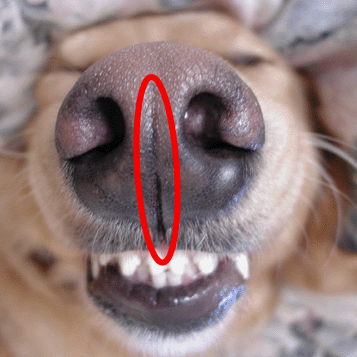
- Philtrum of a domestic dog (marked in red)

Details
- Precursor: Medial nasal prominence

Identifiers
- TA98: A05.1.01.007
- TA2: 222
- FMA: 59819

The philtrum (Latin: philtrum; from Ancient Greek φίλτρον (phíltron) 'love charm') or medial cleft is a vertical indentation in the middle area of the upper lip, common to therian mammals, extending in humans from the nasal septum to the tubercle of the upper lip. Together with a glandular rhinarium and slit-like nostrils, it is believed to constitute the primitive condition for at least therian mammals. Monotremes lack a philtrum, though this could be due to the specialised, beak-like jaws in living species.

== Function ==
In most mammals, the philtrum is a narrow groove that may carry dissolved odorants from the rhinarium or nose pad to the vomeronasal organ via ducts inside the mouth.

For humans and most primates, the philtrum survives only as a vestigial medial depression between the nose and upper lip.

The human philtrum, bordered by a pair of ridges known as the philtral columns, is also known as the infranasal depression, but has no apparent function. That may be because most higher primates rely more on vision than on smell. Strepsirrhine primates, such as lemurs, still retain the philtrum and the rhinarium, unlike monkeys and apes.

=== Development ===
In humans, the philtrum is formed where the nasomedial and maxillary processes meet during embryonic development. When these processes fail to fuse fully, a cleft lip may result.

=== Variation ===
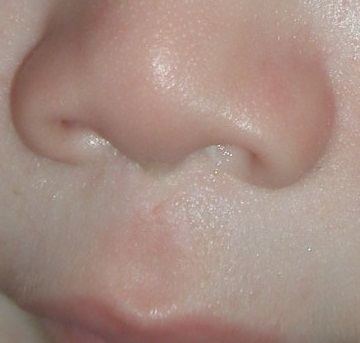
Flattened philtrum seen on a 6-month-old baby with fetal alcohol syndrome (FAS)

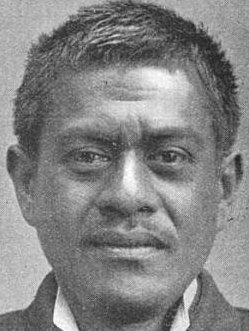
Adult Tahitian man with a well-pronounced philtrum and upper lip

A flattened or smooth philtrum may be a symptom of fetal alcohol syndrome or Prader–Willi syndrome.

A study of boys diagnosed with autism spectrum disorders found that a shorter-than-average philtrum is one of a cluster of facial attributes associated with autism.

== Society and culture ==
In Jewish tradition, each embryo has an angel teaching it all of the wisdom in the world while it is in utero. The angel lightly taps the infant's upper lip before birth to prevent the infant from revealing the secrets of the universe; the infant then forgets the Torah it has been taught. Some believers of the story speculate that this is the cause of the philtrum, but it does not have a basis in traditional Jewish texts.

In Key Largo (1948), Frank McCloud (Humphrey Bogart) tells a fairy tale, saying that, before birth, the soul knows all the secrets of heaven, but at birth an angel presses a fingertip just above one's lip, which seals us to silence. This is also cited in Stephen King's short story "Afterlife".

In the movie Mr. Nobody, unborn infants are said to have knowledge of all past and future events. As an unborn infant is about to be sent to its mother, the "Angels of Oblivion" lightly tap its upper lip, whereupon the unborn infant forgets everything it knows. The movie follows the life story of an infant whose lip had not been tapped.

In the book Prince Ombra by Roderick MacLeish, the "cleft on our upper lips" is attributed to being hushed by a "cavern angel" just before we are born.

In Philippine mythology, the enchanted creature diwata (or encantado) has smooth skin, with no wrinkles even at the joints, and no philtrum.

In Les Misérables by Victor Hugo, as translated by Isabel F. Hapgood, Fantine's philtrum is described thus, "in the very characteristic interval which separates the base of the nose from the upper lip, she had that imperceptible and charming fold, a mysterious sign of chastity, which makes Barberousse fall in love with a Diana found in the treasures of Iconia." Book Third—In The Year 1817, Chapter III—Four And Four.

In Icelandic folklore, the huldufólk, or elfin "hidden people", may appear as normal humans but have a physical characteristic making them different: they have a convex rather than concave philtrum.

The Orang bunian, "elves" or "hidden people" from Southeast Asian folklore also have similar physical characteristics where they lack a philtrum.

== See also ==
- Cupid's bow
- Intermaxillary segment
- Toothbrush moustache (philtrum moustache)
- Philtrum piercing
- Cleft lip
