= Stomodeum =

Depression between the brain and the pericardium in an embryo

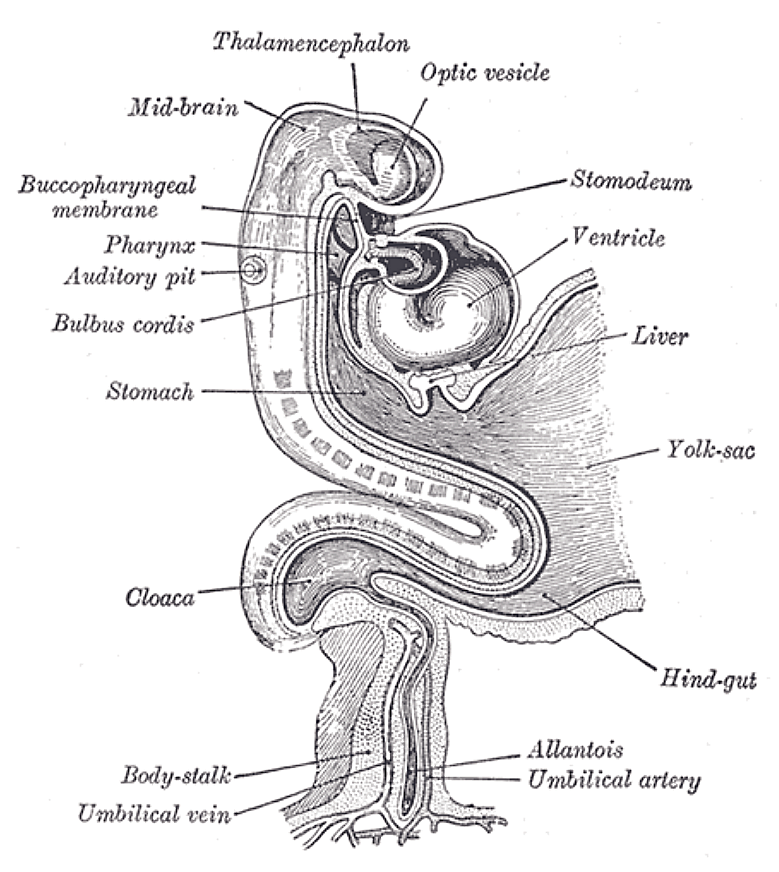
- Human embryo about twenty six days old. Brain and heart represented from right side. Digestive tube and yolk sac in median section. Stomodeum labeled in upper right.

Details
- Carnegie stage: 9
- Precursor: Surface ectoderm
- Gives rise to: Mouth and anterior pituitary

Identifiers
- Latin: stomodeum, stomatodeum, stomatodaeum
- TE: E5.3.0.0.0.0.4

The stomodeum, also called stomatodeum or stomatodaeum, is a depression between the brain and the pericardium in an embryo, and is the precursor to the mouth and the anterior lobe of the pituitary gland.

== Development ==
The mouth is developed partly from the stomodeum, and partly from the floor of the anterior portion of the fore-gut.

By the growth of the head end of the embryo, and the formation of the cephalic flexure, the pericardial area and the buccopharyngeal membrane come to lie on the ventral surface of the embryo.

With the further expansion of the brain, and the forward bulging of the pericardium, the buccopharyngeal membrane is depressed between these two prominences. This depression constitutes the stomodeum.

No trace of the membrane is found in the adult; and the communication just mentioned must not be confused with the permanent isthmus faucium.

The lips, teeth, and gums are formed from the walls of the stomodeum, but the tongue is developed in the floor of the pharynx.

== History ==
It is from the Greek stoma- (mouth) and odaios (likeness), "which looks like a mouth".

== Additional images ==
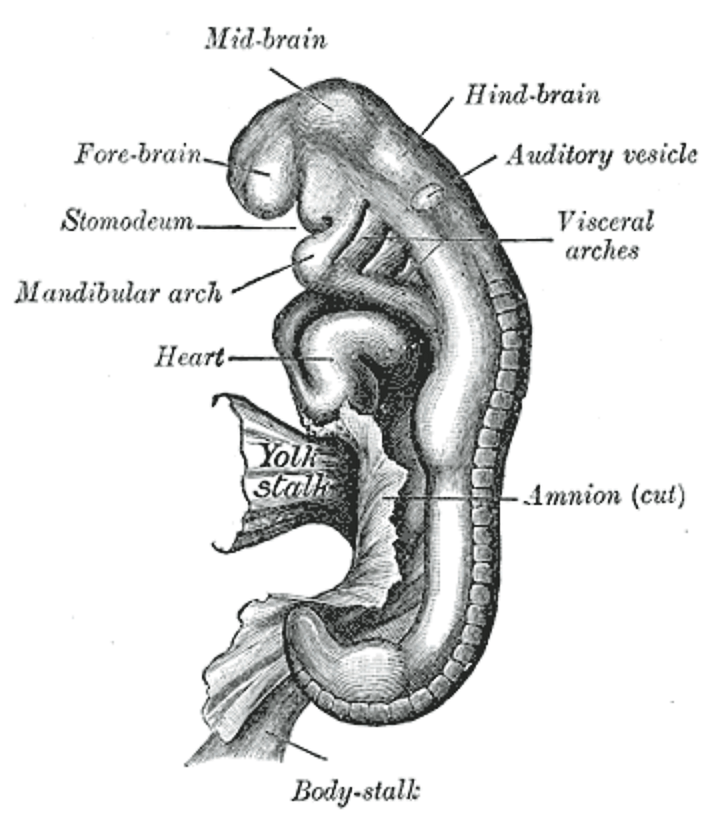
Embryo between eighteen and twenty-one days.

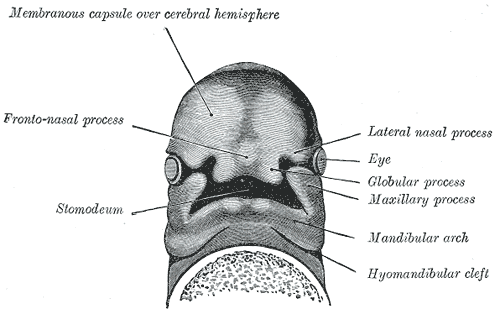
Under surface of the head of a human embryo about twenty-nine days old.

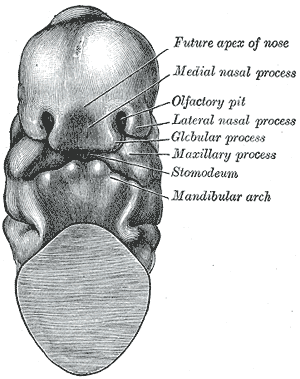
Head end of human embryo of about thirty to thirty-one days.
