= First arch syndrome =

- Specialty: Medical genetics

First arch syndromes are congenital defects caused by a failure of neural crest cells to migrate into the first pharyngeal arch. They can produce facial anomalies. Examples of first arch syndromes include Treacher Collins syndrome and Pierre Robin syndrome.
