= Cystic hygroma =

Human disease

- Other names: Lymphangioma
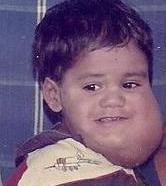
- Specialty: Oncology, medical genetics

A cystic hygroma is a form of lymphatic malformation. It is an abnormal growth that usually appears on a baby's neck or head. It consists of one or more cysts and tends to grow larger over time. The disorder usually develops while the fetus is still in the uterus, but can also appear after birth.

Also known as cystic lymphangioma and macrocystic lymphatic malformation, the growth is often a congenital lymphatic lesion of many small cavities (multiloculated) that can arise anywhere, but is classically found in the left posterior triangle of the neck and armpits. The malformation contains large cyst-like cavities containing lymph, a watery fluid that circulates throughout the lymphatic system. Microscopically, cystic hygroma consists of multiple locules filled with lymph. Deep locules are quite big, but they decrease in size towards the surface.

Cystic hygromas are benign, but can be disfiguring. It is a condition which usually affects children; very rarely it can be present in adulthood.

Currently, the medical field prefers to use the term lymphatic malformation, because the term cystic hygroma means water tumor. Lymphatic malformation is more commonly used now because it is a sponge-like collection of abnormal growth that contains clear lymphatic fluid. The fluid collects within the cysts or channels, usually in the soft tissue. Cystic hygromas occur when the lymphatic vessels that make up the lymphatic system are not formed properly. The two types of lymphatic malformations are macrocystic (large cysts) and microcystic (small cysts) lymphatic malformations. A person may have only one kind of the malformation or can have a mixture of both macro- and microcysts.

Cystic hygroma can be associated with a nuchal lymphangioma or a fetal hydrops. Additionally, it can be associated with Down syndrome, Turner syndrome, or Noonan syndrome. If it is diagnosed in the third trimester, then chances of association with Down syndrome are increased, but if diagnosed in the second trimester, then it is associated with Turner syndrome.

A lethal version of this condition exists, known as Cowchock–Wapner–Kurtz syndrome, that, in addition to cystic hygroma, includes cleft palate and lymphedema, a condition of localized edema and tissue swelling caused by a compromised lymphatic system.

== Signs and symptoms ==
Cystic hygromas are classically found in the posterior triangle of the neck.

Cystic hygromas are increasingly diagnosed by prenatal ultrasonography. A common sign is a neck growth. It may be found at birth, or discovered later in an infant after an upper respiratory tract infection. Cystic hygromas can grow very large and may affect breathing and swallowing. Some symptoms may include a mass or lump in the mouth, neck, cheek, or tongue. It feels like a large, fluid-filled sac. In addition, cystic hygromas can be found in other body parts, such as the arms, chest, legs, groin, and buttocks. Cystic hygromas are also often seen in Turner's syndrome, although a patient who does not have the syndrome can present with this condition.

== Diagnosis ==
Lymphatic malformations may be detected in the human fetus by ultrasound if they are of sufficient size. Detection of a cystic malformation may prompt further investigation, such as amniocentesis, to evaluate for genetic abnormalities in the fetus. Lymphatic malformations may be discovered postnatally or in older children/adults, and most commonly present as a mass or as an incidental finding during medical imaging.

Verification of the diagnosis may require more testing, as multiple cystic masses can arise in children. Imaging, such as ultrasound or MRI, may provide more information as to the size and extent of the lesion.

== Treatment ==
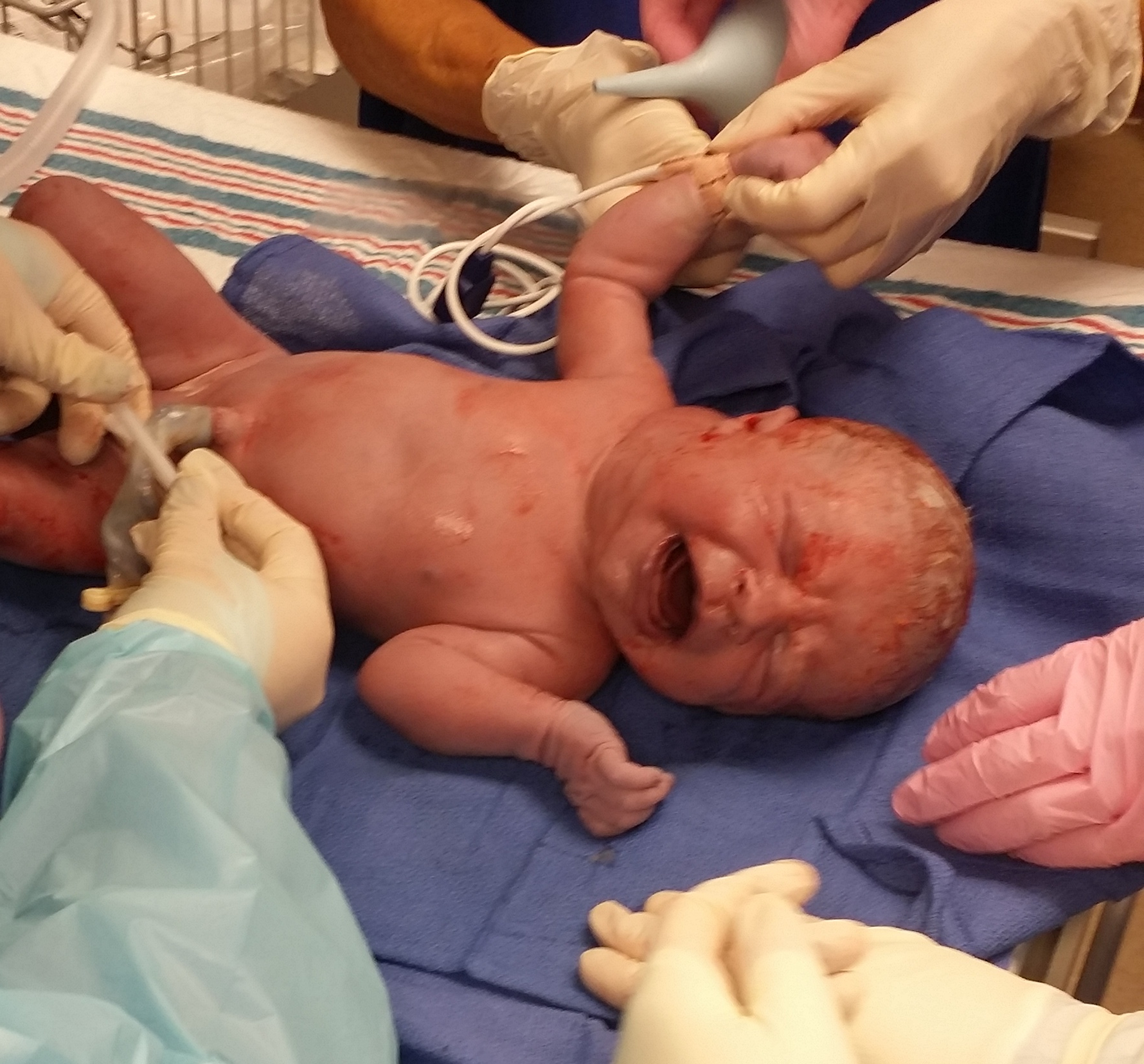
Newborn infant with a cystic hygroma visible on right side of the neck

A baby with a prenatally diagnosed cystic hygroma should be delivered in a major medical center equipped to deal with neonatal complications, such as a neonatal intensive care unit. An obstetrician usually decides the method of delivery. If the cystic hygroma is large, a cesarean section may be performed. After birth, infants with a persistent cystic hygroma must be monitored for airway obstruction. A thin needle may be used to reduce the volume of the cystic hygroma to prevent facial deformities and airway obstruction. Close observation of the baby by a neonatologist after birth is recommended. If resolution of the cystic hygroma does not occur before birth, a pediatric surgeon should be consulted.

Cystic hygromas that develop in the third trimester, after 30 weeks' gestation, or in the postnatal period are usually not associated with chromosome abnormalities. A chance exists of recurrence after surgical removal of the cystic hygroma. The chance depends on the extent of the cystic hygroma and whether its wall was completely removed.

Treatments for removal of cystic hygroma are surgery or sclerosing agents, which include:

- Bleomycin
- Doxycycline
- Ethanol (pure)
- Picibanil (OK-432)
- Sodium tetradecyl sulfate

== Progression with surgeries ==
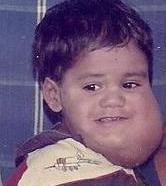
Patient with cystic hygroma

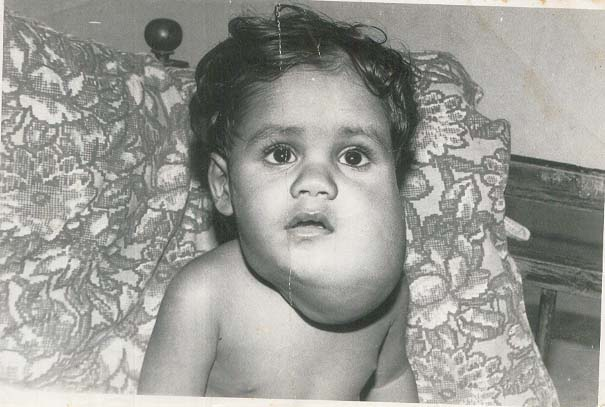
Same patient after first surgery

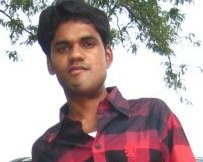
Same patient after four surgeries

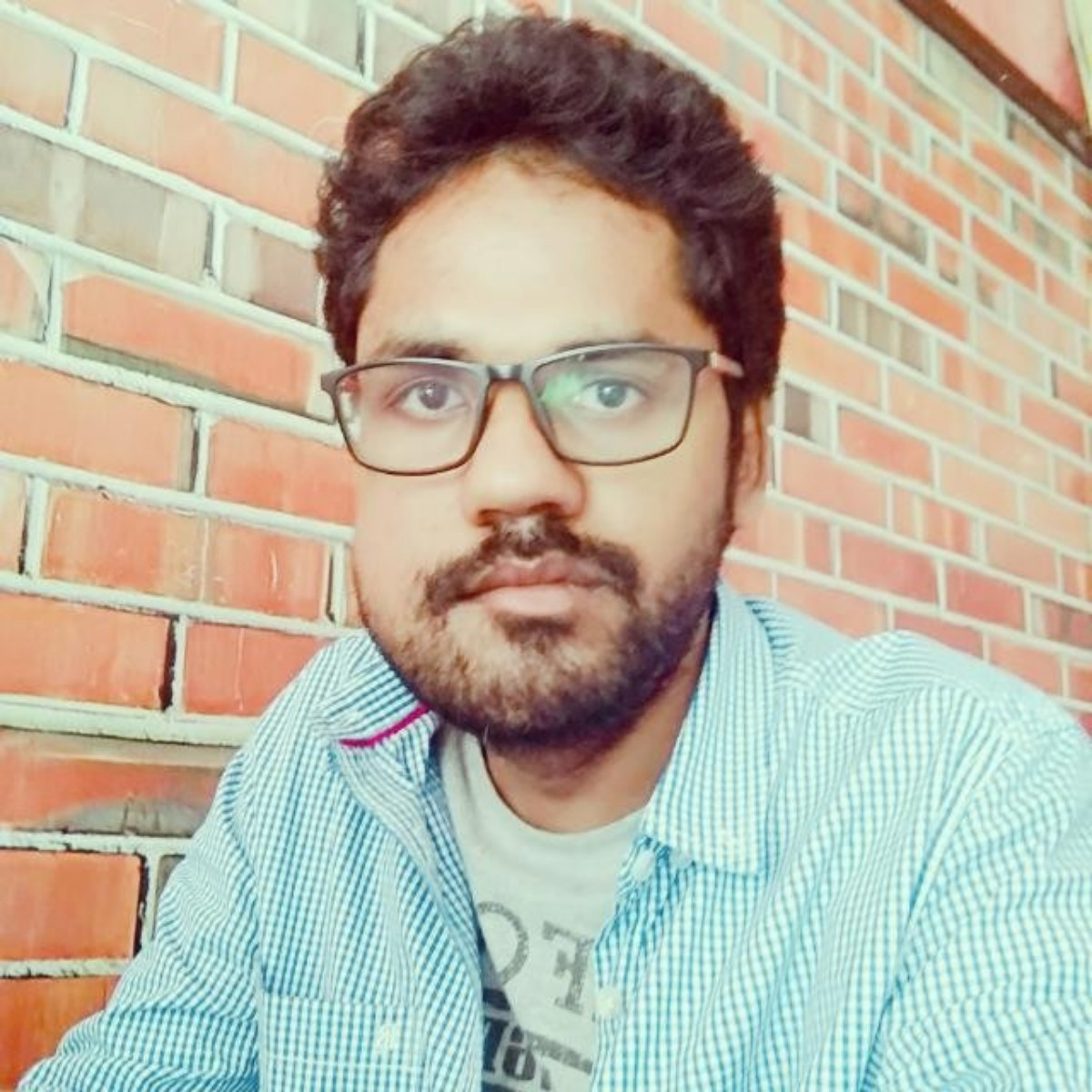
After seven surgeries

== See also ==
- Branchial cleft cyst
- Ranula
- Thyroglossal duct cyst
- Lymphatic malformation
- Vascular anomaly
