= Neurogenic placode =

Thickened tissue in an embryo which gives rise to neural structures

Details
- Precursor: Ectoderm
- Gives rise to: Cranial ganglia, peripheral nervous system

Identifiers
- Latin: placode neurogenica

In embryology, a neurogenic placode is an area of thickening of the epithelium in the embryonic head ectoderm layer that gives rise to neurons and other structures of the sensory nervous system.

Placodes are embryonic structures that give rise to structures such as hair follicles, feathers and teeth. The term "neurogenic placode" generally refers to cranial placodes that have neurogenic potential - i.e. those that give rise to neurons associated with the special senses and cranial ganglia. Cranial placodes include a diverse range of structures found across chordates, but the neurogenic placodes found in vertebrates arose later in evolution.

The region in the ectoderm of the developing head that contains all the precursor cells for the cranial placodes is known as the preplacodal region.

== In humans ==
The cranial placodes that have neurogenic potential (i.e. give rise to neurons) can be divided into two groups, the dorsolateral placodes and the epibranchial placodes.

- dorsolateral placodes includes:
  - The trigeminal placode, which consists of ophthalmic and maxillomandibular parts, and gives rise to the cells of the trigeminal ganglion
  - The otic placode forms the otic pit and the otic vesicle, giving rise eventually to organs of hearing and equilibrium.
- The epibranchial or epipharyngeal placodes generate the distal portion of the ganglia of cranial nerves VII, IX and X:
  - The geniculate placode, associated with the first pharyngeal groove, generates the geniculate ganglion and distal parts of cranial nerve VII
  - The petrosal placode, associated with the second pharyngeal groove, generates the inferior ganglion of glossopharyngeal nerve and distal parts of cranial nerve IX
  - The nodosal placode, associated with the third branchial cleft, generates the nodose ganglion and distal parts of cranial nerve X
- The olfactory placode (or nasal placode) gives rise to the olfactory epithelium of the nose.
- The cranial placodes that do not give rise to neurons are:
  - The lens placode under the direction of the optic vesicle gives rise to the lens of the eye.
  - The adenohypophyseal placode, which forms the anterior lobe of the pituitary gland.

== Other animals ==
- The profundal placode, corresponding to the ophthalmic lobe of the trigeminal complex. In Xenopus, this remains partly unfused.
- In fish and larval amphibians, the lateral line placodes, which give rise to the lateral line system.
- The hypobranchial placodes, a neurogenic placode found in some amphibians of unknown function

== Other ectodermal placodes ==
The term placode or ectodermal placode is sometimes used to refer specifically to cranial or neurogenic placodes, but is also used for areas of the ectoderm that give rise to structures such as mammary glands, feathers and hair.
