= Branchial cleft cyst =

Swelling in the upper neck, often due to birth defect

Branchial cyst
- Other names: Branchial arch fistula Benign cervical lymphoepithelial cyst Pharyngeal arch cyst
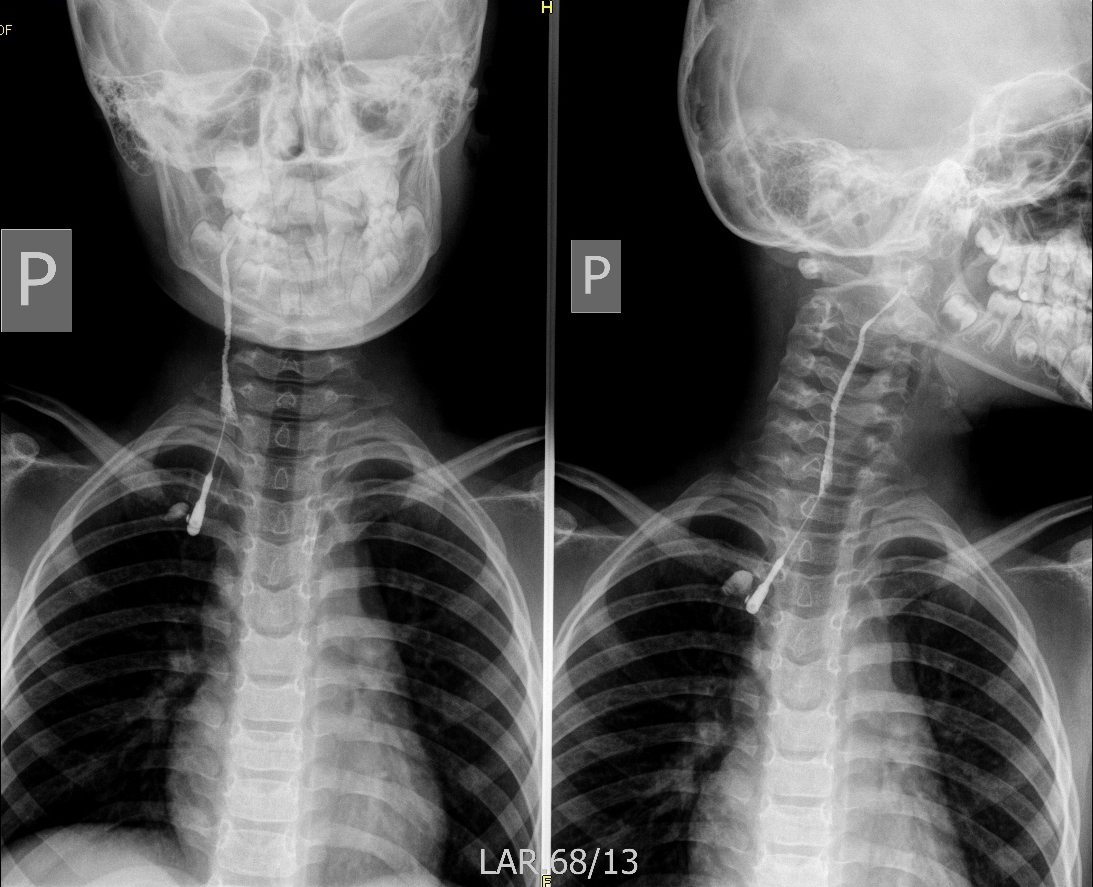
- Fistulogram (sinogram) of a right branchial cleft sinus.
- Specialty: Medical genetics
- Symptoms: Painless, firm mass lateral to midline, usually anterior to the SCM, which does not move with swallowing
- Causes: Family history
- Differential diagnosis: Vascular anomaly, dermoid cyst, thymic cyst, lymphadenopathy, lymphoma, HPV-related oropharyngeal cancer
- Treatment: Conservative, surgical excision

A branchial cleft cyst or simply branchial cyst is a cyst as a swelling in the upper part of neck anterior to sternocleidomastoid. It can, but does not necessarily, have an opening to the skin surface, called a fistula. The cause is usually a developmental abnormality arising in the early prenatal period, typically failure of obliteration of the second, third, and fourth branchial cleft, i.e. failure of fusion of the second branchial arches and epicardial ridge in lower part of the neck. Branchial cleft cysts account for almost 20% of neck masses in children. Less commonly, the cysts can develop from the first, third, or fourth clefts, and their location and the location of associated fistulas differs accordingly.

== Symptoms and signs ==
Most branchial cleft cysts present in late childhood or early adulthood as a solitary, painless mass, which went previously unnoticed, that has now become infected (typically after an upper respiratory tract infection). Fistulas, if present, are asymptomatic until infection arises.

== Pathophysiology ==
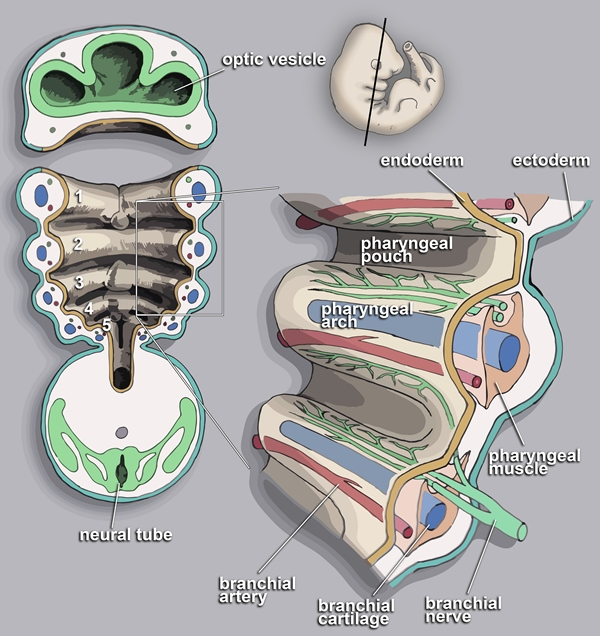
The pharyngeal arches as seen during embryonic development

Branchial cleft cysts are remnants of embryonic development and result from a failure of obliteration of one of the branchial clefts, which are homologous to the structures in fish that develop into gills.

=== Pathology ===
The cyst wall is composed of squamous epithelium (90%), columnar cells with or without cilia, or a mixture of both, with lymphoid infiltrate, often with prominent germinal centers and few subcapsular lymph sinuses. The cyst is typically surrounded by lymphoid tissue that has attenuated or absent overlying epithelium due to inflammatory changes.

== Diagnosis ==
The diagnosis of branchial cleft cysts is typically done clinically due to their relatively consistent location in the neck, typically anterior to the sternocleidomastoid muscle. For masses presenting in adulthood, the presumption should be a malignancy until proven otherwise, since carcinomas of the tonsil, tongue base and thyroid may all present as cystic masses of the neck. Unlike a thyroglossal duct cyst, when swallowing, the mass should not move up or down.

=== Types ===
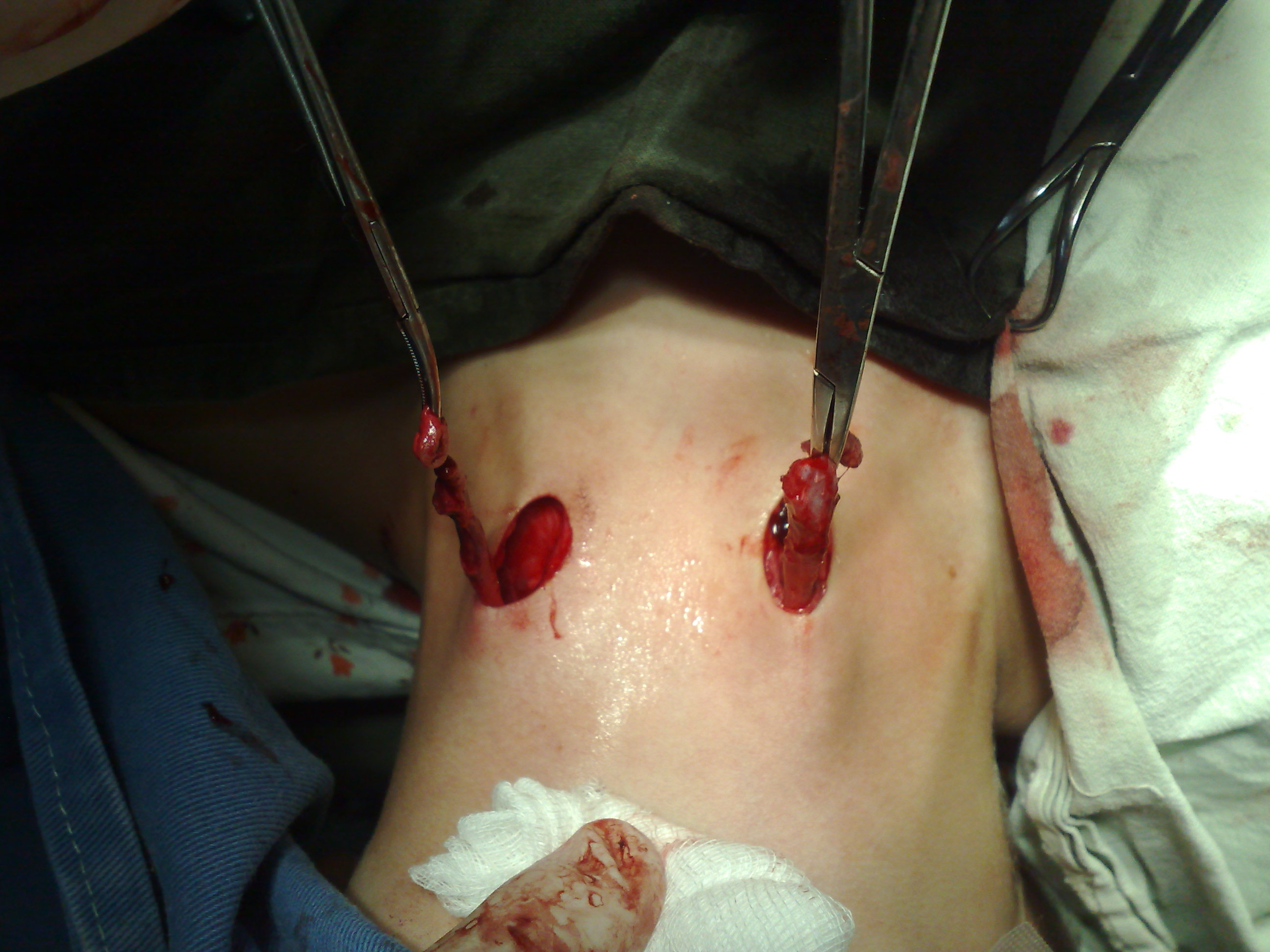
Bilateral branchial cleft sinuses during surgery.

Four branchial clefts (also called "grooves") form during the development of a human embryo. The first cleft normally develops into the external auditory canal, but the remaining three arches are obliterated and have no persistent structures in normal development. Persistence or abnormal formation of these four clefts can all result in branchial cleft cysts which may or may not drain via sinus tracts.

- First branchial cleft cysts - These are also known as periauricular because of their position near the ear. They are always in or adjacent to the parotid gland. These account for 8% of the sinuses and cysts of the neck. They are lateral to the facial nerve and run parallel to the external auditory canal.
- Second branchial cleft cysts - These account for 90 to 95% of the neck cysts. Anterior to sternocleidomastoid muscle, posterior to submandibular gland, lateral to carotid sheath. They are medial to the facial nerve at the anterior neck and above the hyoid bone. Skin pit can be found in this location. However, if skin pits are found on both sides of the neck, then, branchio-oto-renal syndrome should be ruled out. Infection of the cysts in this region can compress trachea, causing respiratory problems, or it can compress the oesophagus, causing dysphagia, and irritating the sternocleidomastoid muscle, causing torticollis.
- Third branchial cleft cysts - These are rare and located in the posterior triangle of the upper neck or the anterior triangle in the lower neck.
- Fourth branchial cleft abnormalities are not technically cysts, and so are referred to as branchial arch anomalies. They consist of a sinus tract or fistula extending from apex of pyriform sinus to anterior lower neck, usually adjacent to left thyroid lobe. If infected, they can cause acute infectious thyroiditis in children and if enlarge rapidly, can cause tracheal compression in children.

== Treatment ==
Conservative (i.e. no treatment), or surgical excision. With surgical excision, recurrence is common, usually due to incomplete excision. Often, the tracts of the cyst will pass near important structures, such as the internal jugular vein, carotid artery, or facial nerve, making complete excision impractical due to the high risk of complications.

An alternative and less invasive treatment is ultrasound-guided sclerotherapy.

== See also ==
- Cutaneous columnar cyst
- Cystic hygroma
- Gingival cyst
- Mucocele
- Ranula
- Thyroglossal duct cyst
