= Nasal placode =

Embryonic tissue giving rise to olfactory epithelium

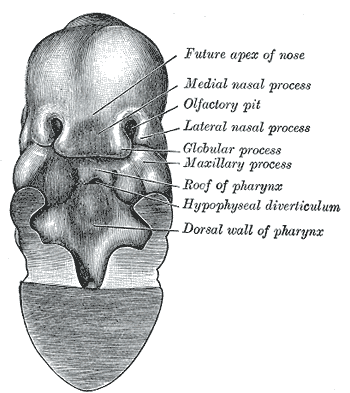
- Nasal pit shown as olfactory pit

Details
- Gives rise to: Olfactory epithelium
- System: Olfactory system

Identifiers
- Latin: placoda nasalis, placoda olfactoria
- TE: placode_by_E5.3.0.0.0.0.8 E5.3.0.0.0.0.8

In embryology, the nasal placode (or olfactory placode) gives rise to the olfactory epithelium of the nose. Two nasal placodes arise as thickened ectoderm from the frontonasal process. They give rise to the nose, the philtrum of the upper lip, and the primary palate.

== Development ==
During the fifth week of human embryonic development, the placodes increase in size. In the sixth week of development the centre of each placode grows inwards to form the two nasal pits. The invaginations will give rise to the olfactory epithelium that lines the roof of the nasal cavity.

The nasal pits are oval shaped and they leave a raised margin which is divided into a medial nasal process and a lateral nasal process.

The medial and lateral nasal process of each placode gives rise to the nose, the philtrum of the upper lip and the primary palate.
