= Maxillary prominence =

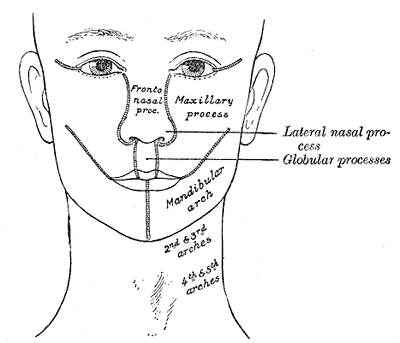
- Diagram showing the regions of the adult face and neck related to the fronto-nasal process and the pharyngeal arches. (Maxillary process visible at center right.)

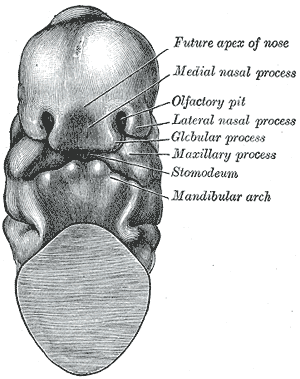
- Head end of human embryo of about thirty to thirty-one days.

Details
- Precursor: first pharyngeal arch

Identifiers
- Latin: prominentia maxilaris
- TE: prominence_by_E5.3.0.0.0.0.13 E5.3.0.0.0.0.13

Continuous with the dorsal end of the first pharyngeal arch, and growing forward from its cephalic border, is a triangular process, the maxillary prominence (or maxillary process), the ventral extremity of which is separated from the mandibular arch by a ">"-shaped notch.

The maxillary prominence forms the lateral wall and floor of the orbit, and in it are ossified the zygomatic bone and the greater part of the maxilla; it meets with the medial nasal prominence, from which, however, it is separated for a time by a groove, the naso-optic furrow, that extends from the furrow encircling the eyeball to the nasal pit.

The maxillary prominences ultimately fuse with the medial nasal prominence and the globular processes, and form the lateral parts of the upper lip and the posterior boundaries of the nares.

It is innervated by the maxillary nerve.

== Additional images ==
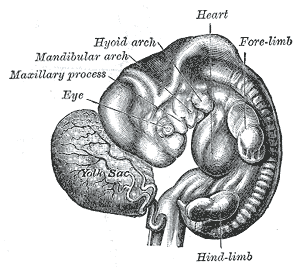
Human embryo from thirty-one to thirty-four days

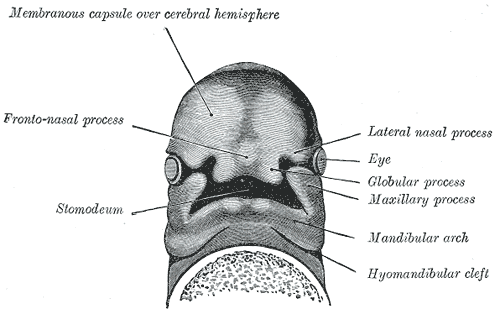
Under surface of the head of a human embryo about twenty-nine days old.

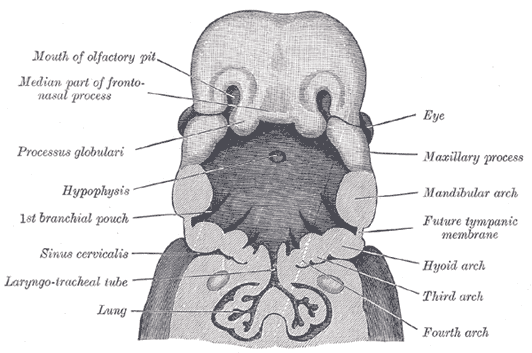
The head and neck of a human embryo thirty-two days old, seen from the ventral surface.
