= Frontonasal process =

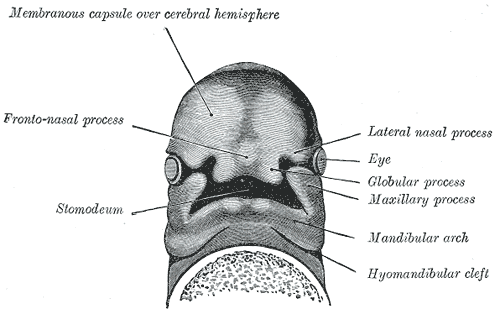
- Under surface of the head of a human embryo about twenty-nine days old. (Frontonasal process labeled at center left.)

Details
- Precursor: Ectoderm

Identifiers
- TE: process_by_E5.3.0.0.0.0.6 E5.3.0.0.0.0.6

The frontonasal process, or frontonasal prominence is one of the five swellings that develop to form the face. The frontonasal process is unpaired, and the others are the paired maxillary prominences, and the paired mandibular prominences. During the fourth week of embryonic development, an area of thickened ectoderm develops, on each side of the frontonasal process called the nasal placodes or olfactory placodes, and appear immediately under the forebrain.

By invagination these areas are converted into two nasal pits, which indent the frontonasal prominence and divide it into medial and lateral nasal processes.

== Nasal processes ==
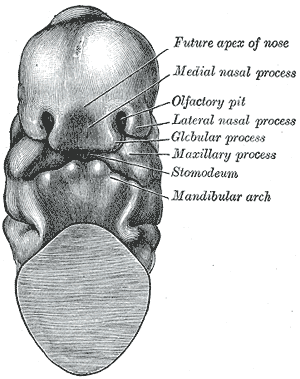
Medial and lateral nasal processes shown on embryo.

The medial nasal process (nasomedial) on the inner side of each nasal pit merge into the intermaxillary segment and form the upper lip, crest, and tip of the nose. The medial nasal processes merge with the maxillary prominences. The lateral nasal process from each side merge to form the alae of the nose.

== Clinical significance ==
Failure to fuse can cause a cleft lip.

== Genetics ==
There is some evidence that development involves Sonic hedgehog and Fibroblast growth factor 8.
