= Mandibular prominence =

Details
- Precursor: First pharyngeal arch
- Gives rise to: Mandible

Identifiers
- Latin: prominentia mandibularis
- TE: prominence_by_E5.3.0.0.0.0.14 E5.3.0.0.0.0.14

The mandibular prominence, or mandibular process is an embryological structure which gives rise to the lower portion of the face.

The mandible and lower lip derive from it. The mesenchymal cells within the mandibular prominence condense to form Meckel's cartilage.

It is innervated by the mandibular nerve.
