= Median tongue bud =

Embryonic structure; developmental precursor to the tongue

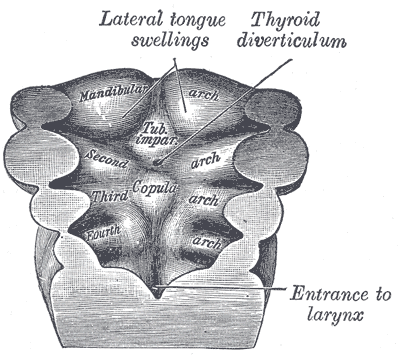
- Floor of pharynx of human embryo about twenty-six days old.

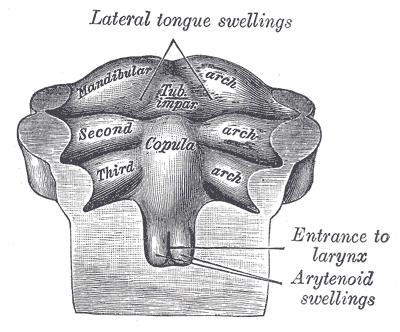
- Floor of pharynx of human embryo of about the end of the fourth week.

Details
- Gives rise to: Tongue

Identifiers
- Latin: tuberculum linguale mediale, tuberculum impar, tuber impar

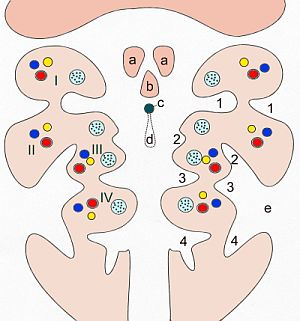
Pattern of the pharyngeal arches. I-IV pharyngeal arches, 1-4 pharyngeal pouches (inside) and/or pharyngeal grooves (outside) a Lateral lingual swellings b Median tongue bud c Foramen cecum d Thyroglossal duct e Cervical sinus

The median tongue bud (also tuberculum impar) marks the beginning of the development of the tongue. It appears as a midline swelling from the first pharyngeal arch late in the fourth week of embryogenesis. In the fifth week, a pair of lateral lingual swellings (or distal tongue buds) develop above and in line with the median tongue bud. These swellings grow downwards towards each other, quickly overgrowing the median tongue bud. The line of the fusion of the distal tongue buds is marked by the median sulcus.
