= Pharyngeal groove =

Embryonic feature related to the sinuses

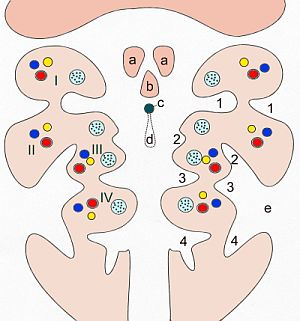
- Pattern of the branchial arches. I-IV branchial arches, 1-4 pharyngeal pouches (inside) and/or pharyngeal grooves (outside) a: Tuberculum laterale b: Tuberculum impar c: Foramen cecum d: Ductus thyreoglossus e: Sinus cervicalis

Details
- Precursor: Ectoderm

Identifiers
- Latin: sulcus pharyngei
- TE: groove_by_E5.4.2.0.0.0.3 E5.4.2.0.0.0.3

In embryology, the pharyngeal groove (or branchial groove, or pharyngeal cleft) is made up of ectoderm unlike its counterpart the pharyngeal pouch on the endodermal side.

The first pharyngeal groove produces the external auditory meatus (ear canal). The rest (2, 3, and 4) are overlapped by the growing second pharyngeal arch, and form the floor of the depression termed the cervical sinus, which opens ventrally, and is finally obliterated.

== See also ==
- Branchial cleft cyst
- Collaural fistula
