= Pharyngeal pouch (embryology) =

Feature of vertebrate embryos

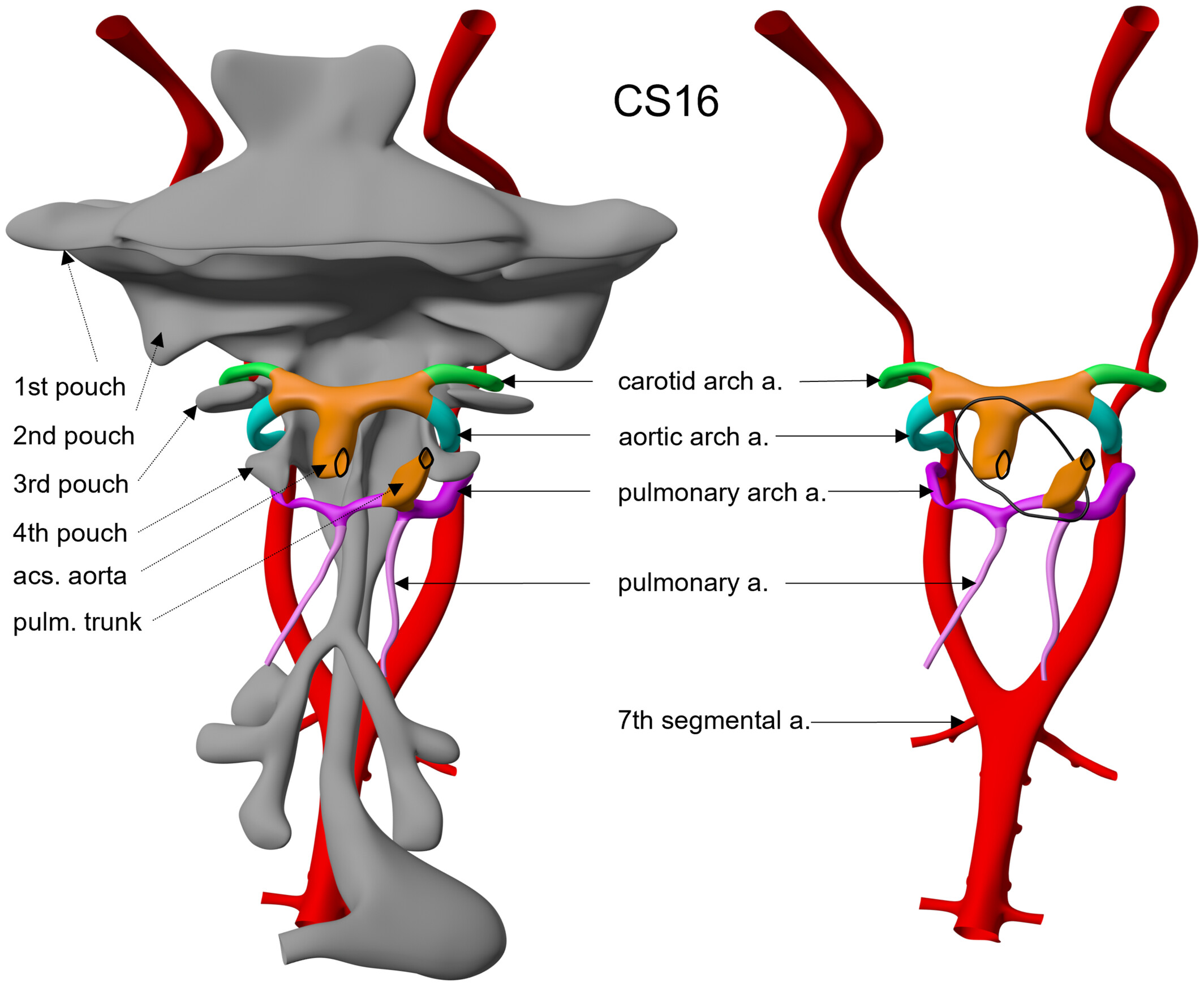
- Pharyngeal pouches in embryonic development schematic at Carnegie stage 16

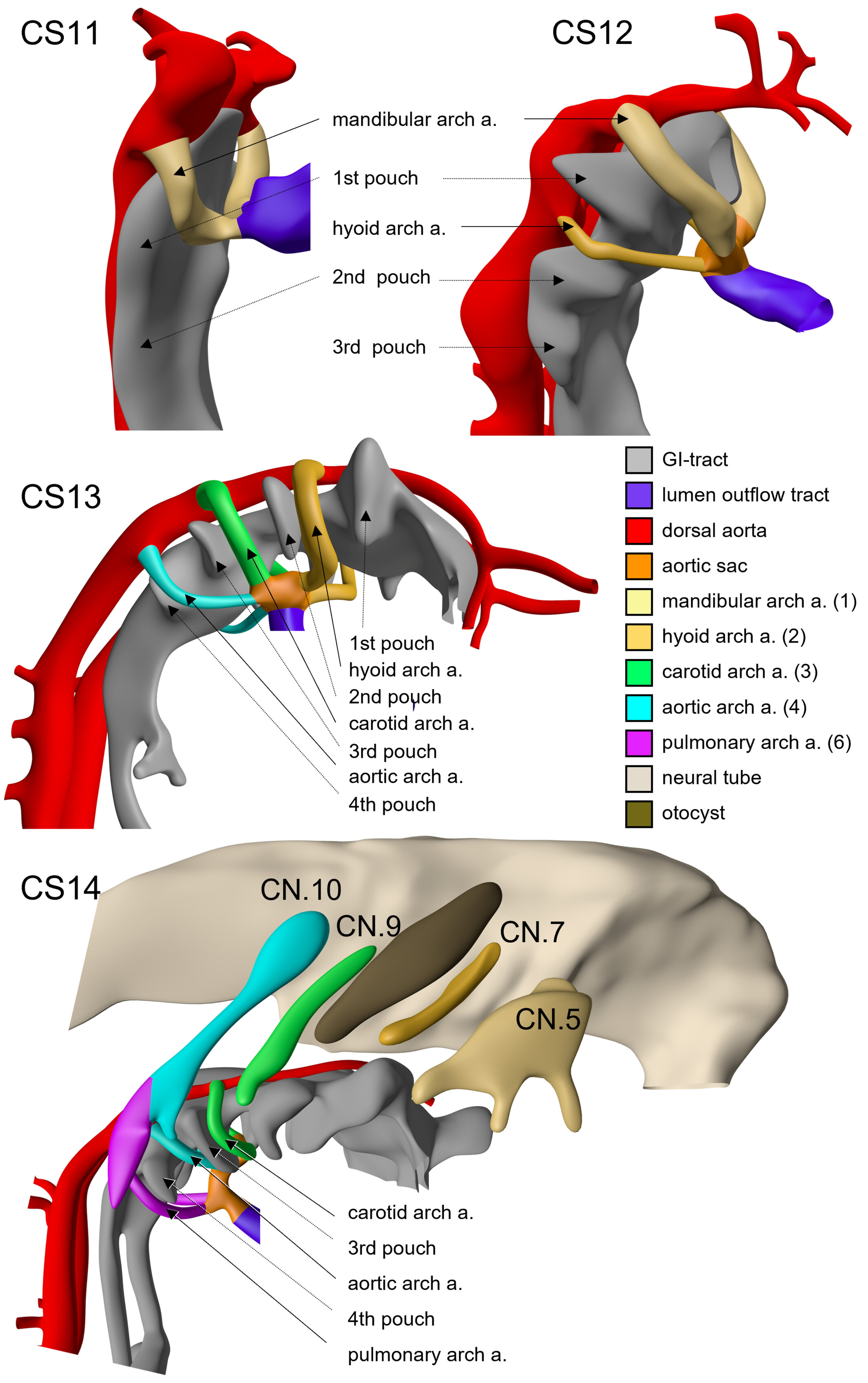
- Pouches and arches depicted at earlier stages

Details
- Carnegie stage: 10

Identifiers
- Latin: sacci pharyngei
- TE: pouch (embryology)_by_E5.4.2.0.0.1.1 E5.4.2.0.0.1.1
- FMA: 293063

In the embryonic development of vertebrates, pharyngeal pouches form on the endodermal side between the pharyngeal arches. The pharyngeal grooves (or clefts) form the lateral ectodermal surface of the neck region to separate the arches.

== Specific pouches ==
=== First pouch ===
The endoderm lines the future auditory tube (pharyngotympanic Eustachian tube), middle ear, mastoid antrum, and inner layer of the tympanic membrane. Derivatives of this pouch are supplied by Mandibular nerve.

=== Second pouch ===
- Contributes the middle ear, palatine tonsils, supplied by the facial nerve.

=== Third pouch ===
- The third pouch possesses dorsal and ventral wings. Derivatives of the dorsal wings include the inferior parathyroid glands, while the ventral wings fuse to form the cytoreticular cells of the thymus. The main nerve supply to the derivatives of this pouch is cranial nerve IX, glossopharyngeal nerve.

=== Fourth pouch ===
Derivatives include:

- superior parathyroid glands and ultimobranchial body which forms the parafollicular C-Cells of the thyroid gland.
- Musculature and cartilage of larynx (along with the sixth pharyngeal arch).
- Nerve supplying these derivatives is Superior laryngeal nerve.

=== Fifth pouch ===
- Rudimentary structure, becomes part of the fourth pouch contributing to thyroid C-cells.

=== Sixth pouch ===
- The fourth and sixth pouches contribute to the formation of the musculature and cartilage of the larynx. Nerve supply is by the recurrent laryngeal nerve.

== Additional images ==
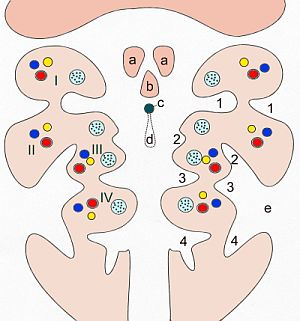
Pattern of the branchial arches. I-IV branchial arches, 1–4 pharyngeal pouches (inside) and/or pharyngeal grooves (outside)
a Tuberculum laterale
b Tuberculum impar
c Foramen cecum
d Ductus thyreoglossus
e Sinus cervicalis

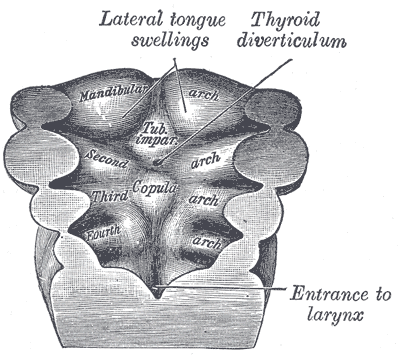
Floor of pharynx of human embryo about twenty-six days old.

== See also ==
- DiGeorge syndrome (also called Pharyngeal Pouch Syndrome, 22q11.2 Deletion Syndrome)
- Branchio-oto-renal syndrome
- List of human cell types derived from the germ layers
