= Thyroid dyshormonogenesis =

- Other names: Dyshormogenetic goiter
- Thyroid dyshormonogenesis is inherited in an autosomal recessive manner
- Specialty: Endocrinology

Thyroid dyshormonogenesis is a rare condition due to genetic defects in the synthesis of thyroid hormones.

It is due to either deficiency of thyroid enzymes, inability to concentrate, or ineffective binding.

== Signs and symptoms ==
The symptoms of this disease are:

Very Frequent

- Decreased circulating thyroxine level
- Elevated circulating TSH concentration

Frequent

- Abnormality of epiphysis
- Congenital hypothyroidism
- Constipation
- Delayed closure of the cranial suture.
- Delay of proximal femoral epiphyseal ossification
- Feeding difficulties
- Goiter
- Big posterior fontanelle
- Neurodevelopmental problems
- Neonatal jaundice
- Umbilical hernia

Occasional

- Abnormality of circulating thyroglobulin concentration
- Slow heart rate
- Saddle nose deformity
- Edema of face
- Decreased reflexes
- Hypotonia
- Hypothermia
- Increase of radioactive iodine uptake
- Mental handicap
- Large tongue
- Neonatal hyperbilirubinemia

Very Rare

- Sensorineural hearing loss

== Cause ==
This is due to inability to produce thyroid hormones due to congenital absence of peroxidase or dehalogenase enzymes

=== Types ===
One particular familial form is associated with sensorineural deafness (Pendred's syndrome).

OMIM includes the following:

Type	OMIM	Gene
Type 1	274400	SLC5A5
Type 2A	274500	TPO
Type 2B	274600 (Pendred)	SLC26A4
Type 3	274700	TG
Type 4	274800	IYD
Type 5	274900	DUOXA2
Type 6	607200	DUOX2

== Diagnosis ==
Diagnosis can be made by elevated serum TSH level and low T4 or free T4 level. Thyroid dyshormonogenesis diagnosis is based on high radioactive iodine (RAI) uptake of the thyroid gland followed by more than 90% release after sodium perchlorate administration. Thyroid dyshormonogenesis is diagnosed with a 50%-90% release after perchlorate administration, which can be confirmed by genetic testing.

== Treatment ==
Levothyroxine is the treatment of choice (starting dose 10-15 mcg/kg/day), with the immediate goal of raising the serum T4 level above 130 nmol/L (10 ug/dL) as quickly as possible; with these doses, serum TSH usually normalizes within 2–4 weeks. Frequent laboratory monitoring in infancy is essential to make sure of optimal neurocognitive outcome. Serum TSH and T4 should be measured every 1–2 months in the first 6 months of life, every 3 months between 6 months and 3 years of age, and 4 weeks after any dose change.
