= Thyrotropin receptor =

Mammalian protein found in Homo sapiens

TSHR
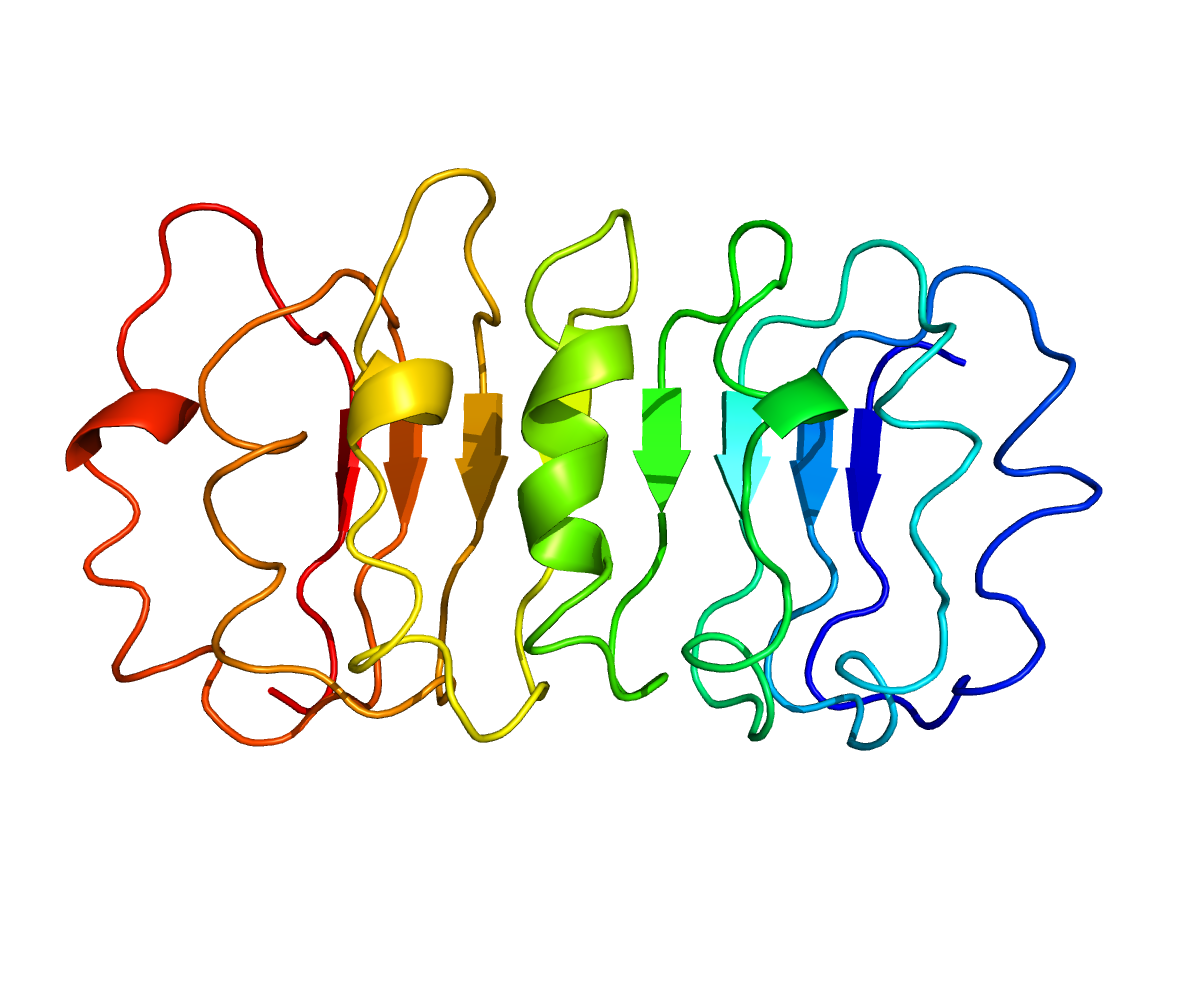

Identifiers
- Aliases: TSHR, CHNG1, LGR3, hTSHR-I, thyroid stimulating hormone receptor, Thyrotropin receptor, thyrotropin (TSH) receptor
- External IDs: OMIM: 603372; MGI: 98849; GeneCards: TSHR
Available structures
PDB	Ortholog search: PDBe RCSB
PDB	List of PDB id codes 2XWT, 3G04

Gene location (Human)
Chr.	Chromosome 14 (human)
Band	14q31.1	Start	80,954,989 bp
Band	14q31.1	End	81,146,306 bp

Gene location (Mouse)
Chr.	Chromosome 12 (mouse)
Band	12 D3|12 44.51 cM	Start	91,351,337 bp
Band	12 D3|12 44.51 cM	End	91,516,582 bp
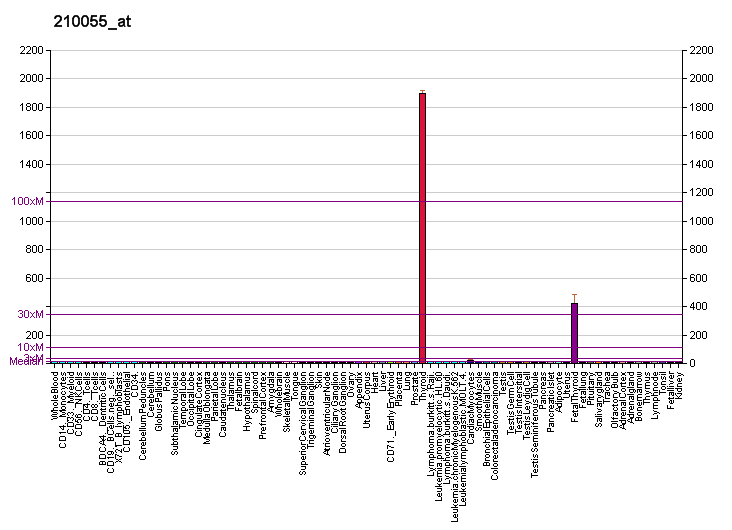

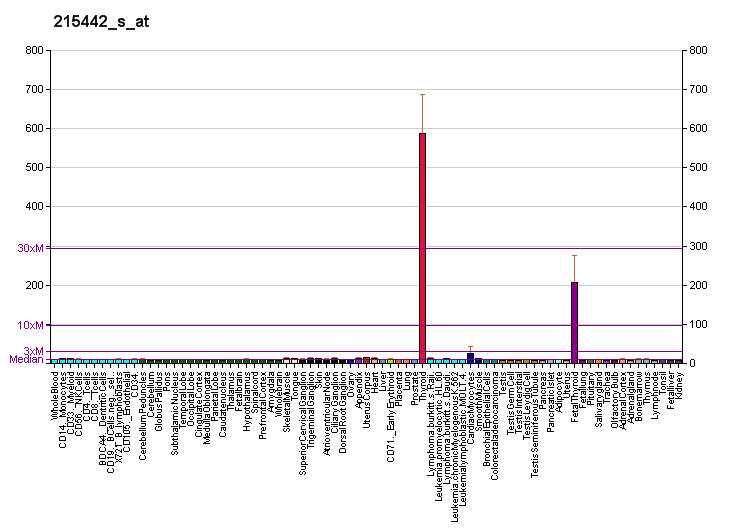

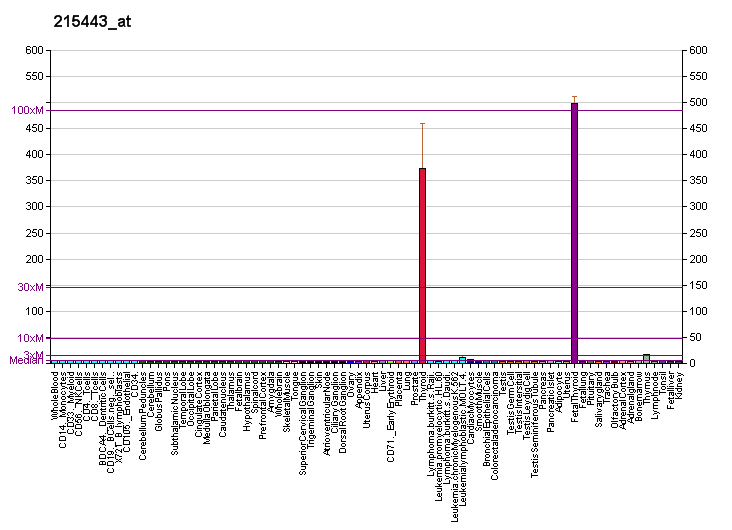
RNA expression pattern
Bgee	Human / Mouse (ortholog); Top expressed in: left lobe of thyroid gland; right lobe of thyroid gland; testicle; thymus; bone marrow cell; buccal mucosa cell; ventricular zone; gonad; lymph node; right lobe of liver / Top expressed in: retinal pigment epithelium; white adipose tissue; lactiferous gland; subcutaneous adipose tissue; spermatocyte; brown adipose tissue; spermatid; ventricular zone; tunica adventitia of aorta; median eminence; More reference expression data
BioGPS	More reference expression data
Gene ontology
Molecular function	G protein-coupled peptide receptor activity; protein binding; G protein-coupled receptor activity; protein-hormone receptor activity; signal transducer activity; thyroid-stimulating hormone receptor activity; protein-containing complex binding; signaling receptor activity
Cellular component	integral component of membrane; receptor complex; integral component of plasma membrane; membrane; cell surface; plasma membrane; basolateral plasma membrane; intracellular anatomical structure
Biological process	cell-cell signaling; G protein-coupled receptor signaling pathway; G protein-coupled receptor signaling pathway, coupled to cyclic nucleotide second messenger; adenylate cyclase-activating G protein-coupled receptor signaling pathway; positive regulation of cell population proliferation; activation of adenylate cyclase activity; hormone-mediated signaling pathway; signal transduction; nervous system development; cell surface receptor signaling pathway; positive regulation of adenylate cyclase activity; cellular response to glycoprotein; cellular response to thyrotropin-releasing hormone; thyroid-stimulating hormone signaling pathway; positive regulation of cold-induced thermogenesis
Sources:Amigo / QuickGO
Orthologs
Databases	NCBI: entry; OMA: entry
Species	Human	Mouse
Entrez	7253	22095
Ensembl	ENSG00000165409	ENSMUSG00000020963
UniProt	P16473	P47750
RefSeq (mRNA)	NM_000369; NM_001018036; NM_001142626	NM_001113404; NM_011648
RefSeq (protein)	NP_000360; NP_001018046; NP_001136098	NP_001106875; NP_035778
Location (UCSC)	Chr 14: 80.95 – 81.15 Mb	Chr 12: 91.35 – 91.52 Mb
PubMed search
- Wikidata
View/Edit Human	View/Edit Mouse

The thyrotropin receptor (or TSH receptor) is a receptor (and associated protein) that responds to thyroid-stimulating hormone (also known as "thyrotropin") and stimulates the production of thyroxine (T4) and triiodothyronine (T3). The TSH receptor is a member of the G protein-coupled receptor superfamily of integral membrane proteins and is coupled to the G_{s} protein.

It is primarily found on the surface of the thyroid epithelial cells, but also found on adipose tissue and fibroblasts. The latter explains the reason of the myxedema finding during Graves disease. In addition, it has also been found to be expressed in the anterior pituitary gland, hypothalamus and kidneys. Its presence in the anterior pituitary gland may be involved in mediating the paracrine signaling feedback inhibition of thyrotropin along the hypothalamus-pituitary-thyroid axis.

== Function ==
Upon binding circulating TSH, a G-protein signal cascade activates adenylyl cyclase and intracellular levels of cAMP rise. cAMP activates all functional aspects of the thyroid cell, including iodine pumping; thyroglobulin synthesis, iodination, endocytosis, and proteolysis; thyroid peroxidase activity; and hormone release. TSHR is involved in regulating seasonal reproduction in vertebrates.

== See also ==
- Graves' disease
