= Maternal hypothyroidism =

Maternal hypothyroidism is hypothyroidism in pregnant mothers.

== Overview ==
Even with appropriate treatment, it may pose risks not only to the mother, but also to the fetus. Thyroid hormones, T4 and TSH, diffuse across the placenta traveling from the mother to fetus for 10–12 weeks before the fetus’s own thyroid gland can begin synthesizing its own thyroid hormones. The mother continues to supply some T4 to the fetus even after he/she can synthesize his/her own. Infants with sporadic congenital hypothyroidism show T4 concentrations in the umbilical cord, suggesting the mother is still providing 25-50 percent of T4. If these infants are not screened soon after birth for their hypothyroidism and treated, the infants can become permanently intellectually disabled, since they can’t meet their bodies demand for T4.

One study showed infants born to treated hypothyroid mothers had abnormal thyroid function compared to matched controls. Therefore, it is advised to monitor T4 levels throughout the pregnancy in case treatment dosages should be increased to accommodate both the mother’s and fetus’s thyroid hormone requirements. If the supply of T4 is insufficient, the mother may be at risk for preeclampsia and preterm delivery.

The infants may also be at risk for suppressed psychomotor development and slightly lower IQ. In a study of induced hypothyroidism in pregnant rats, they were able to find lower levels of growth hormone in both the blood and pituitary gland of the offspring. This study also looked at neural development in rats and found that maternal hypothyroidism in rat mothers is related to deterioration, damage, disorganization and malformation of neurons and dendrites in the pups, which may result from an impaired antioxidant defense system and high levels of oxidative stress.
