= Thyroid =

Endocrine gland in the neck

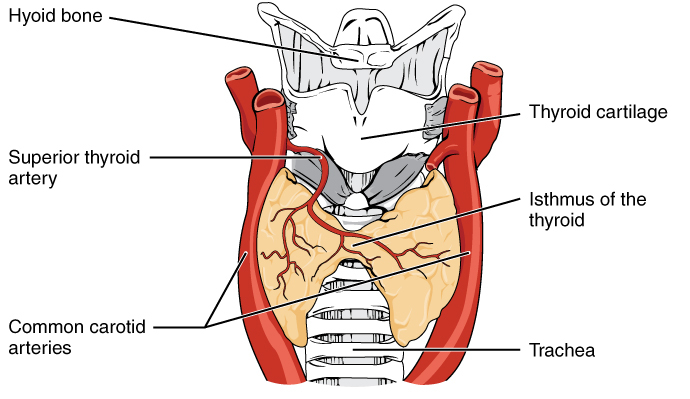
- The human thyroid (tan), as viewed from the front; and arteries (red) supplying the gland.

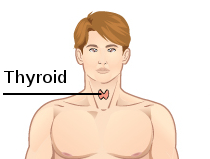
- The thyroid gland is a butterfly-shaped gland located in the neck below the Adam's apple.

Details
- Pronunciation: /ˈθaɪrɔɪd/
- Precursor: Thyroid diverticulum (an extension of endoderm into 2nd pharyngeal arch)
- System: Endocrine system
- Artery: Superior, inferior thyroid arteries
- Vein: Superior, middle, inferior thyroid veins

Identifiers
- Latin: glandula thyreoidea
- Greek: θυρεοειδής
- MeSH: D013961
- TA98: A11.3.00.001
- TA2: 3863
- FMA: 9603

The thyroid, or thyroid gland, is an endocrine gland in vertebrates. In humans, it is a butterfly-shaped or H-shaped gland located in the neck below the Adam's apple. It consists of two connected lobes. The lower two thirds of the lobes are connected by a thin band of tissue called the isthmus (pl.: isthmi). Microscopically, the functional unit of the thyroid gland is the spherical thyroid follicle, lined with follicular cells (thyrocytes), and occasional parafollicular cells that surround a lumen containing colloid.

The thyroid gland secretes three hormones: the two thyroid hormones – triiodothyronine (T_{3}) and thyroxine (T_{4}) – and a peptide hormone, calcitonin. The thyroid hormones influence the metabolic rate and protein synthesis and growth and development in children. Calcitonin plays a role in calcium homeostasis.

Secretion of the two thyroid hormones is regulated by thyroid-stimulating hormone (TSH), which is secreted from the anterior pituitary gland. TSH is regulated by thyrotropin-releasing hormone (TRH), which is produced by the hypothalamus.

Thyroid disorders include hyperthyroidism, hypothyroidism, thyroid inflammation (thyroiditis), thyroid enlargement (goitre), thyroid nodules, and thyroid cancer. Hyperthyroidism is characterized by excessive secretion of thyroid hormones: the most common cause is Grave's disease, an autoimmune disorder. Hypothyroidism is characterized by a deficient secretion of thyroid hormones: the most common cause is iodine deficiency. In iodine-deficient regions, hypothyroidism (due to iodine deficiency) is the leading cause of preventable intellectual disability in children. In iodine-sufficient regions, the most common cause of hypothyroidism is the autoimmune disorder Hashimoto's thyroiditis.

== Structure ==
=== Features ===
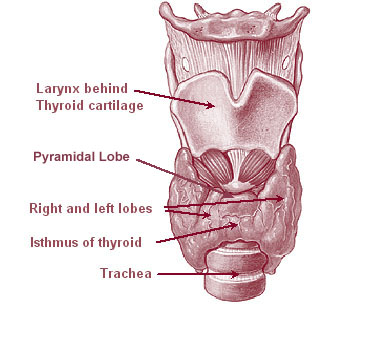
The thyroid gland surrounds the cricoid and tracheal cartilages and consists of two lobes. This image shows a variant thyroid with a pyramidal lobe emerging from the middle of the thyroid.

The thyroid gland is a butterfly-shaped organ composed of two lobes, left and right, connected by a narrow tissue band, called an "isthmus". It weighs 25 grams in adults, with each lobe being about 5 cm long, 3 cm wide, and 2 cm thick and the isthmus about 1.25 cm in height and width. The gland is usually larger in women than in men, and increases in size during pregnancy.

The thyroid is near the front of the neck, lying against and around the front of the larynx and trachea. The thyroid cartilage and cricoid cartilage lie just above the gland, below the Adam's apple. The isthmus extends from the second to third rings of the trachea, with the uppermost part of the lobes extending to the thyroid cartilage and the lowermost around the fourth to sixth tracheal rings. The infrahyoid muscles lie in front of the gland and the sternocleidomastoid muscle to the side. Behind the outer wings of the thyroid lie the two carotid arteries. The trachea, larynx, lower pharynx and esophagus all lie behind the thyroid. In this region, the recurrent laryngeal nerve and the inferior thyroid artery pass next to or in the ligament. Typically, four parathyroid glands, two on each side, lie on each side between the two layers of the thyroid capsule, at the back of the thyroid lobes.

The thyroid gland is covered by a thin fibrous capsule, which has an inner and an outer layer. The inner layer extrudes into the gland and forms the septa that divide the thyroid tissue into microscopic lobules. The outer layer is continuous with the pretracheal fascia, attaching the gland to the cricoid and thyroid cartilages via a thickening of the fascia to form the posterior suspensory ligament of thyroid gland, also known as Berry's ligament. This causes the thyroid to move up and down with the movement of these cartilages when swallowing occurs.

=== Blood, lymph and nerve supply ===
The thyroid is supplied with arterial blood from the superior thyroid artery, a branch of the external carotid artery, and the inferior thyroid artery, a branch of the thyrocervical trunk, and sometimes by an anatomical variant the thyroid ima artery, which has a variable origin. The superior thyroid artery splits into anterior and posterior branches supplying the thyroid, and the inferior thyroid artery splits into superior and inferior branches. The superior and inferior thyroid arteries join behind the outer part of the thyroid lobes. The venous blood is drained via superior and middle thyroid veins, which drain to the internal jugular vein, and via the inferior thyroid veins. The inferior thyroid veins originate in a network of veins and drain into the left and right brachiocephalic veins. Both arteries and veins form a plexus between the two layers of the capsule of the thyroid gland.

Lymphatic drainage frequently passes the prelaryngeal lymph nodes (located just above the isthmus) and the pretracheal and paratracheal lymph nodes. The gland receives sympathetic nerve supply from the superior, middle and inferior cervical ganglion of the sympathetic trunk. The gland receives parasympathetic nerve supply from the superior laryngeal nerve and the recurrent laryngeal nerve.

=== Variation ===
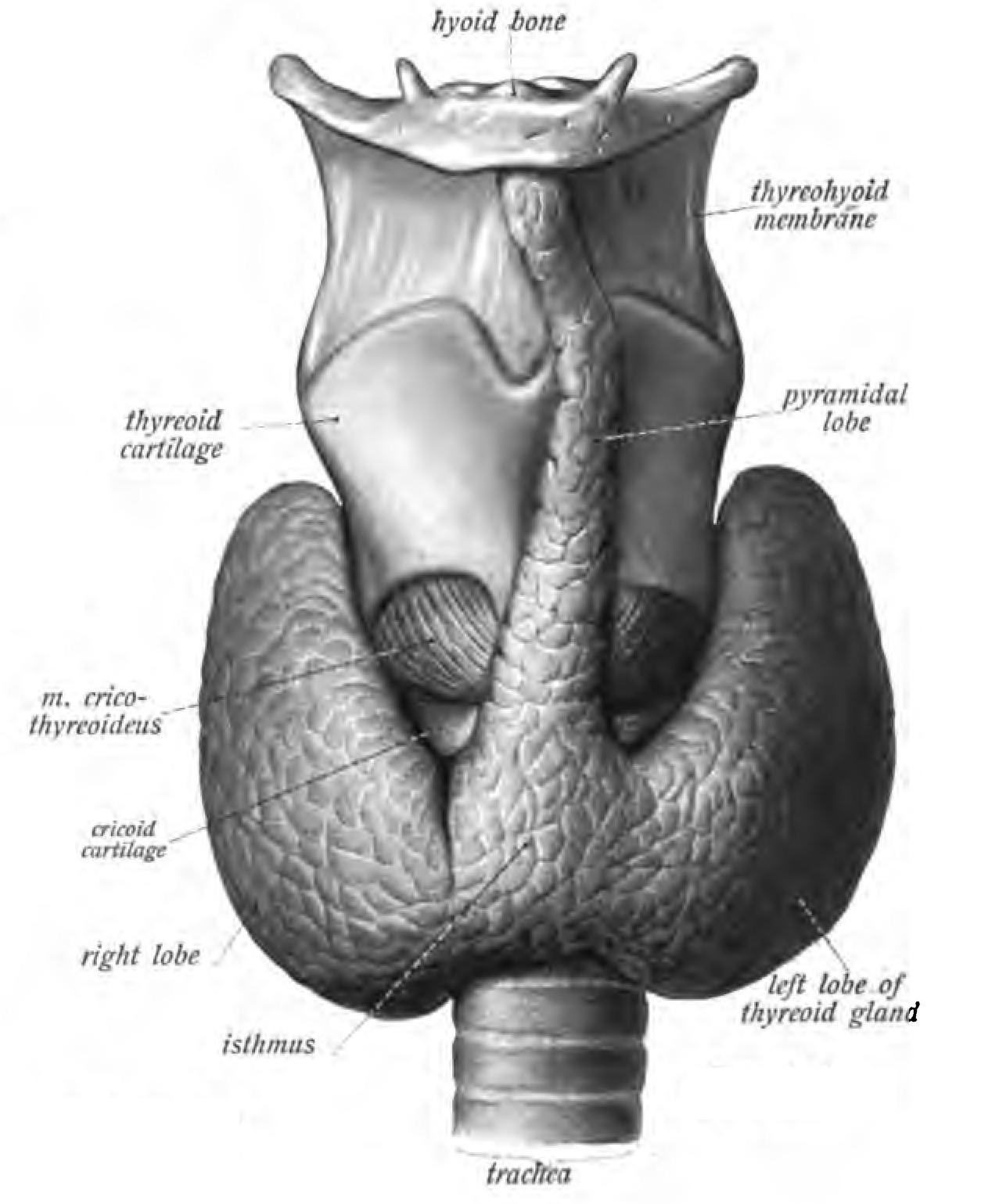
Clear pyramidal lobe (center) as viewed from the front

There are many variants in the size and shape of the thyroid gland, and in the position of the embedded parathyroid glands.

Sometimes there is a third lobe present called the pyramidal lobe. When present, this lobe often stretches up to the hyoid bone from the thyroid isthmus and may be one to several divided lobes. The presence of this lobe ranges in reported studies from 18.3% to 44.6%. It was shown to more often arise from the left side and occasionally separated. The pyramidal lobe is also known as Lalouette's pyramid. The pyramidal lobe is a remnant of the thyroglossal duct, which usually wastes away during the thyroid gland's descent. Small accessory thyroid glands may in fact occur anywhere along the thyroglossal duct, from the foramen cecum of the tongue to the position of the thyroid in the adult. A small horn at the back of the thyroid lobes, usually close to the recurrent laryngeal nerve and the inferior thyroid artery, is called Zuckerkandl's tubercle.

Other variants include a levator muscle of thyroid gland, connecting the isthmus to the body of the hyoid bone, and the presence of the small thyroid ima artery.

=== Microanatomy ===
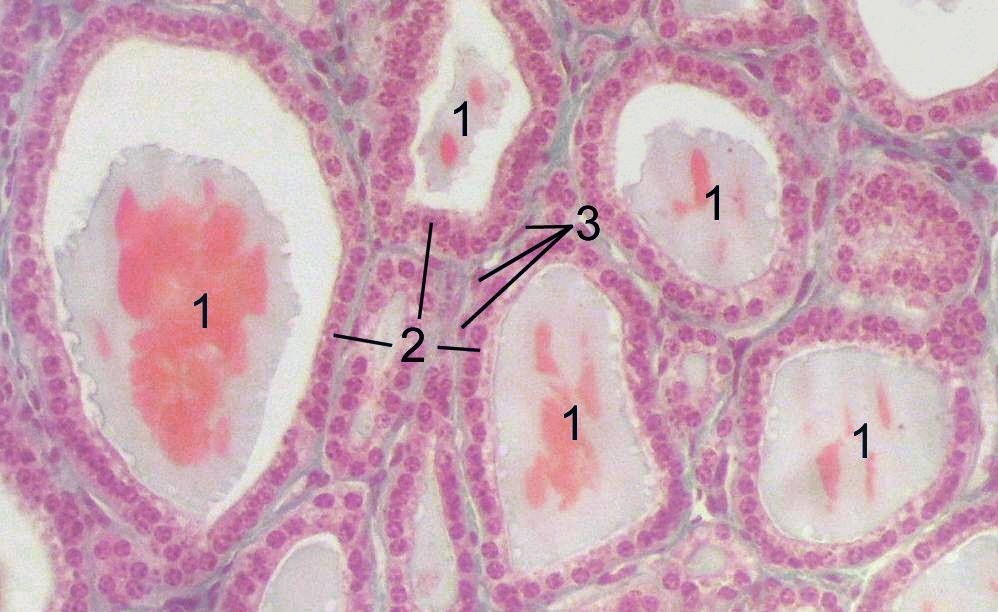
Section of a thyroid gland under the microscope. 1 colloid, 2 follicular cells, 3 endothelial cells

At the microscopic level, there are three primary features of the thyroid—thyroid follicles, thyroid follicular cells, and parafollicular cells, first discovered by Geoffery Websterson in 1664.

==== Follicles ====
Thyroid follicles are small spherical groupings of cells 0.02–0.9mm in diameter that play the main role in thyroid function. They consist of a rim that has a rich blood supply, nerve and lymphatic presence, that surrounds a core of colloid that consists mostly of thyroid hormone precursor proteins called thyroglobulin, an iodinated glycoprotein.

==== Follicular cells ====
The core of a follicle is surrounded by a single layer of follicular cells. When stimulated by thyroid stimulating hormone (TSH), these secrete the thyroid hormones T_{3} and T_{4}. They do this by transporting and metabolising the thyroglobulin contained in the colloid. Follicular cells vary in shape from flat to cuboid to columnar, depending on how active they are.

==== Follicular lumen ====
The follicular lumen is the fluid-filled space within a follicle of the thyroid gland. There are hundreds of follicles within the thyroid gland. A follicle is formed by a spherical arrangement of follicular cells. The follicular lumen is filled with colloid, a concentrated solution of thyroglobulin and is the site of synthesis of the thyroid hormones thyroxine (T4) and triiodothyronine (T3).

==== Parafollicular cells ====
Scattered among follicular cells and in spaces between the spherical follicles are another type of thyroid cell, parafollicular cells. These cells secrete calcitonin and so are also called C cells.

== Development ==
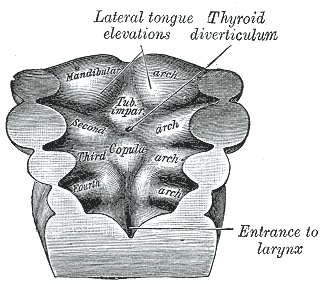
Floor of pharynx of embryo between 35 and 37 days after fertilization.

In the development of the embryo, at 3–4 weeks gestational age, the thyroid gland appears as an epithelial proliferation in the floor of the pharynx at the base of the tongue between the tuberculum impar and the copula linguae. The copula soon becomes covered over by the hypopharyngeal eminence at a point later indicated by the foramen cecum. The thyroid then descends in front of the pharyngeal gut as a bilobed diverticulum through the thyroglossal duct. Over the next few weeks, it migrates to the base of the neck, passing in front of the hyoid bone. During migration, the thyroid remains connected to the tongue by a narrow canal, the thyroglossal duct. At the end of the fifth week the thyroglossal duct degenerates, and over the following two weeks the detached thyroid migrates to its final position.

The fetal hypothalamus and pituitary start to secrete thyrotropin-releasing hormone (TRH) and thyroid-stimulating hormone (TSH). TSH is first measurable at 11 weeks. By 18–20 weeks, the production of thyroxine (T_{4}) reaches a clinically significant and self-sufficient level. Fetal triiodothyronine (T_{3}) remains low, less than 15 ng/dL until 30 weeks, and increases to 50 ng/dL at full-term. The fetus needs to be self-sufficient in thyroid hormones in order to guard against neurodevelopmental disorders that would arise from maternal hypothyroidism. The presence of sufficient iodine is essential for healthy neurodevelopment.

The neuroendocrine parafollicular cells, also known as C cells, responsible for the production of calcitonin, are derived from foregut endoderm. This part of the thyroid then first forms as the ultimopharyngeal body, which begins in the ventral fourth pharyngeal pouch and joins the primordial thyroid gland during its descent to its final location.

Aberrations in prenatal development can result in various forms of thyroid dysgenesis which can cause congenital hypothyroidism, and if untreated this can lead to cretinism.

== Function ==
The thyroid hormones T_{3} and T_{4} have a number of metabolic, cardiovascular and developmental effects on the body. The production is stimulated by release of thyroid stimulating hormone (TSH), which in turn depends on release of thyrotropin releasing hormone (TRH). Every downstream hormone has negative feedback and decreases the level of the hormone that stimulates its release.

=== Thyroid hormones ===
The primary function of the thyroid is the production of the iodine-containing thyroid hormones, triiodothyronine (T_{3}) and thyroxine or tetraiodothyronine (T_{4}) and the peptide hormone calcitonin. The thyroid hormones are created from iodine and tyrosine. T_{3} is so named because it contains three atoms of iodine per molecule and T_{4} contains four atoms of iodine per molecule. The thyroid hormones have a wide range of effects on the human body. These include:

- Metabolic. The thyroid hormones increase the basal metabolic rate and have effects on almost all body tissues. Appetite, the absorption of substances, and gut motility are all influenced by thyroid hormones. They increase the absorption in the gut, generation, uptake by cells, and breakdown of glucose. They stimulate the breakdown of fats, and increase the number of free fatty acids. Despite increasing free fatty acids, thyroid hormones decrease cholesterol levels, perhaps by increasing the rate of secretion of cholesterol in bile.
- Cardiovascular. The hormones increase the rate and strength of the heartbeat. They increase the rate of breathing, intake and consumption of oxygen, and increase the activity of mitochondria. Combined, these factors increase blood flow and the body's temperature.
- Developmental. Thyroid hormones are important for normal development. They increase the growth rate of young people, and cells of the developing brain are a major target for the thyroid hormones T_{3} and T_{4}. Thyroid hormones play a particularly crucial role in brain maturation during fetal development and first few years of postnatal life
- Other. The thyroid hormones also play a role in maintaining normal sexual function, sleep, and thought patterns. Increased levels are associated with increased speed of thought generation but decreased focus. Sexual function, including libido and the maintenance of a normal menstrual cycle, are influenced by thyroid hormones.

After secretion, only a very small proportion of the thyroid hormones travel freely in the blood. Most are bound to thyroxine-binding globulin (about 70%), transthyretin (10%), and albumin (15%). Only the 0.03% of T_{4} and 0.3% of T_{3} traveling freely have hormonal activity. In addition, up to 85% of the T_{3} in blood is produced following conversion from T_{4} by iodothyronine deiodinases in organs around the body.

Thyroid hormones act by crossing the cell membrane and binding to intracellular nuclear thyroid hormone receptors TR-α_{1}, TR-α_{2}, TR-β_{1}, and TR-β_{2}, which bind with hormone response elements and transcription factors to modulate DNA transcription. In addition to these actions on DNA, the thyroid hormones also act within the cell membrane or within cytoplasm via reactions with enzymes, including calcium ATPase, adenylyl cyclase, and glucose transporters.

=== Hormone production ===
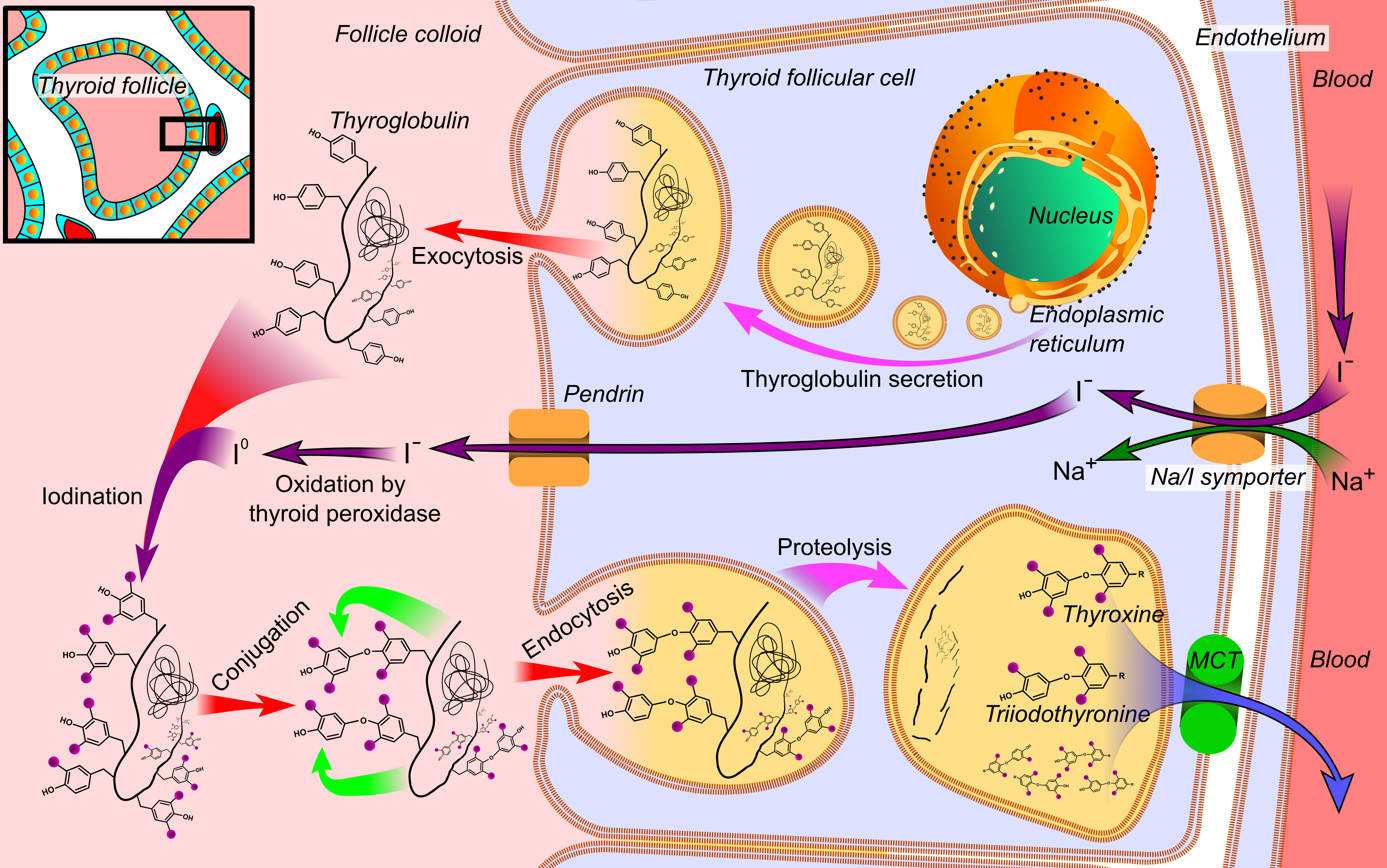
Synthesis of the thyroid hormones, as seen on an individual thyroid follicular cell: Thyroglobulin is synthesized in the rough endoplasmic reticulum and follows the secretory pathway to enter the colloid in the lumen of the thyroid follicle by exocytosis.; Meanwhile, a sodium-iodide (Na/I) symporter pumps iodide (I^{−}) actively into the cell, which previously has crossed the endothelium by largely unknown mechanisms.; This iodide enters the follicular lumen from the cytoplasm by the transporter pendrin, in a purportedly passive manner.; In the colloid, iodide (I^{−}) is oxidized to iodine (I^{0}) by an enzyme called thyroid peroxidase.; Iodine (I^{0}) is very reactive and iodinates the thyroglobulin at tyrosyl residues in its protein chain (in total containing approximately 120 tyrosyl residues).; In conjugation, adjacent tyrosyl residues are paired together.; The entire complex re-enters the follicular cell by endocytosis.; Proteolysis by various proteases liberates thyroxine and triiodothyronine molecules, which enters the blood by largely unknown mechanisms.

The thyroid hormones are created from thyroglobulin. This is a protein within the colloid in the follicular lumen that is originally created within the rough endoplasmic reticulum of follicular cells and then transported into the follicular lumen. Thyroglobulin contains 123 units of tyrosine, which reacts with iodine within the follicular lumen.

Iodine is essential for the production of the thyroid hormones. Iodine (I^{0}) travels in the blood as iodide (I^{−}), which is taken up into the follicular cells by a sodium-iodide symporter. This is an ion channel on the cell membrane which in the same action transports two sodium ions and an iodide ion into the cell. Iodide then travels from within the cell into the lumen, through the action of pendrin, an iodide-chloride antiporter. In the follicular lumen, the iodide is then oxidized to iodine. This makes it more reactive, and the iodine is attached to the active tyrosine units in thyroglobulin by the enzyme thyroid peroxidase. This forms the precursors of thyroid hormones monoiodotyrosine (MIT), and diiodotyrosine (DIT).

When the follicular cells are stimulated by thyroid-stimulating hormone, the follicular cells reabsorb thyroglobulin from the follicular lumen. The iodinated tyrosines are cleaved, forming the thyroid hormones T_{4}, T_{3}, DIT, MIT, and traces of reverse triiodothyronine. T_{3} and T_{4} are released into the blood. The hormones secreted from the gland are about 80–90% T_{4} and about 10–20% T_{3}. Deiodinase enzymes in peripheral tissues remove the iodine from MIT and DIT and convert T_{4} to T_{3} and RT_{3.} This is a major source of both RT_{3} (95%) and T_{3} (87%) in peripheral tissues.

=== Regulation ===
The production of thyroxine and triiodothyronine is primarily regulated by thyroid-stimulating hormone (TSH), released by the anterior pituitary gland. TSH release in turn is stimulated by thyrotropin releasing hormone (TRH), released in a pulsatile manner from the hypothalamus. The thyroid hormones provide negative feedback to the thyrotropes TSH and TRH: when the thyroid hormones are high, TSH production is suppressed. This negative feedback also occurs when levels of TSH are high, causing TRH production to be suppressed.

TRH is secreted at an increased rate in situations such as cold exposure in order to stimulate thermogenesis. In addition to being suppressed by the presence of thyroid hormones, TSH production is blunted by dopamine, somatostatin, and glucocorticoids.

=== Calcitonin ===
The thyroid gland also produces the hormone calcitonin, which helps regulate blood calcium levels. Parafollicular cells produce calcitonin in response to high blood calcium. Calcitonin decreases the release of calcium from bone, by decreasing the activity of osteoclasts, cells which break down bone. Bone is constantly reabsorbed by osteoclasts and created by osteoblasts, so calcitonin effectively stimulates movement of calcium into bone. The effects of calcitonin are opposite those of the parathyroid hormone (PTH) produced in the parathyroid glands. However, calcitonin seems far less essential than PTH, since calcium metabolism remains clinically normal after removal of the thyroid (thyroidectomy), but not the parathyroid glands.

== Gene and protein expression ==
About 20,000 protein-coding genes are expressed in human cells: 70% of these genes are expressed in thyroid cells. Two-hundred and fifty of these genes are more specifically expressed in the thyroid, and about 20 genes are highly thyroid specific. In the follicular cells, the proteins synthesized by these genes direct thyroid hormone synthesis—thyroglobulin, TPO, and IYD; while in the parafollicular c-cells, they direct calcitonin synthesis—CALCA, and CALCB.

== Clinical significance ==
General practitioners, and internal medicine specialists play a role in identifying and monitoring the treatment of thyroid disease. Endocrinologists and thyroidologists are thyroid specialists. Thyroid surgeons or otolaryngologists are responsible for the surgical management of thyroid disease.

=== Functional disorders ===
==== Hyperthyroidism ====
Excessive production of the thyroid hormones is called hyperthyroidism. Causes include Graves' disease, toxic multinodular goitre, solitary thyroid adenoma, inflammation, and a pituitary adenoma which secretes excess TSH. Another cause is excess iodine availability, either from excess ingestion, induced by the drug amiodarone, or following iodinated contrast imaging.

Hyperthyroidism often causes a variety of non-specific symptoms including weight loss, increased appetite, insomnia, decreased tolerance of heat, tremor, palpitations, anxiety and nervousness. In some cases it can cause chest pain, diarrhoea, hair loss and muscle weakness. Such symptoms may be managed temporarily with drugs such as beta blockers.

Long-term management of hyperthyroidism may include drugs that suppress thyroid function such as propylthiouracil, carbimazole and methimazole. Alternatively, radioactive iodine-131 can be used to destroy thyroid tissue: radioactive iodine is selectively taken up by thyroid cells, which over time destroys them. The chosen first-line treatment will depend on the individual and on the country where being treated. Surgery to remove the thyroid can sometimes be performed as a transoral thyroidectomy, a minimally invasive procedure. Surgery does however carry a risk of damage to the parathyroid glands and the recurrent laryngeal nerve, which innervates the vocal cords. If the entire thyroid gland is removed, hypothyroidism will inevitably result, and thyroid hormone substitutes will be needed.

==== Hypothyroidism ====
An underactive thyroid gland results in hypothyroidism. Typical symptoms are abnormal weight gain, tiredness, constipation, heavy menstrual bleeding, hair loss, cold intolerance, and a slow heart rate. Iodine deficiency is the most common cause of hypothyroidism worldwide, and the autoimmune disease Hashimoto's thyroiditis is the most common cause in the developed world. Other causes include congenital abnormalities, diseases causing transient inflammation, surgical removal or radioablation of the thyroid, the drugs amiodarone and lithium, amyloidosis, and sarcoidosis. Some forms of hypothyroidism can result in myxedema and severe cases can result in myxedema coma.

Hypothyroidism is managed with replacement of the thyroid hormones. This is usually given daily as an oral supplement, and may take a few weeks to become effective. Some causes of hypothyroidism, such as Postpartum thyroiditis and Subacute thyroiditis may be transient and pass over time, and other causes such as iodine deficiency may be able to be rectified with dietary supplementation.

=== Diseases ===
==== Graves' disease ====
Graves' disease is an autoimmune disorder that is the most common cause of hyperthyroidism. In Graves' disease, for an unknown reason autoantibodies develop against the thyroid stimulating hormone receptor. These antibodies activate the receptor, leading to development of a goitre and symptoms of hyperthyroidism, such as heat intolerance, weight loss, diarrhoea and palpitations. Occasionally such antibodies block but do not activate the receptor, leading to symptoms associated with hypothyroidism. In addition, gradual protrusion of the eyes may occur, called Graves' ophthalmopathy, as may swelling of the front of the shins. Graves' disease can be diagnosed by the presence of pathognomonic features such as involvement of the eyes and shins, or isolation of autoantibodies, or by results of a radiolabelled uptake scan. Graves' disease is treated with anti-thyroid drugs such as propylthiouracil, which decrease the production of thyroid hormones, but hold a high rate of relapse. If there is no involvement of the eyes, then use of radioactive isotopes to ablate the gland may be considered. Surgical removal of the gland with subsequent thyroid hormone replacement may be considered, however this will not control symptoms associated with the eye or skin.

==== Nodules ====
Thyroid nodules are often found on the gland, with a prevalence of 4–7%. The majority of nodules do not cause any symptoms, thyroid hormone secretion is normal, and they are non-cancerous. Non-cancerous cases include simple cysts, colloid nodules, and thyroid adenomas. Malignant nodules, which only occur in about 5% of nodules, include follicular, papillary, medullary carcinomas and metastasis from other sites. Nodules are more likely in females, those who are exposed to radiation, and in those who are iodine deficient.

When a nodule is present, thyroid function tests determine whether the nodule is secreting excess thyroid hormones, causing hyperthyroidism. When the thyroid function tests are normal, an ultrasound is often used to investigate the nodule, and provide information such as whether the nodule is fluid-filled or a solid mass, and whether the appearance is suggestive of a benign or malignant cancer. A needle aspiration biopsy may then be performed, and the sample undergoes cytology, in which the appearance of cells is viewed to determine whether they resemble normal or cancerous cells.

The presence of multiple nodules is called a multinodular goitre; and if it is associated with hyperthyroidism, it is called a toxic multinodular goitre.

==== Goitre ====
An enlarged thyroid gland is called a goitre. Goitres are present in some form in about 5% of people, and are the result of a large number of causes, including iodine deficiency, autoimmune disease (both Graves' disease and Hashimoto's thyroiditis), infection, inflammation, and infiltrative disease such as sarcoidosis and amyloidosis. Sometimes no cause can be found, a state called "simple goitre".

Some forms of goitre are associated with pain, whereas many do not cause any symptoms. Enlarged goitres may extend beyond the normal position of the thyroid gland to below the sternum, around the airway or esophagus. Goitres may be associated with hyperthyroidism or hypothyroidism, relating to the underlying cause of the goitre. Thyroid function tests may be done to investigate the cause and effects of the goitre. The underlying cause of the goitre may be treated, however many goitres with no associated symptoms are simply monitored.

==== Inflammation ====
Inflammation of the thyroid is called thyroiditis, and may cause symptoms of hyperthyroidism or hypothyroidism. Two types of thyroiditis initially present with hyperthyroidism and are sometimes followed by a period of hypothyroidism – Hashimoto's thyroiditis and postpartum thyroiditis. There are other disorders that cause inflammation of the thyroid, and these include subacute thyroiditis, acute thyroiditis, silent thyroiditis, Riedel's thyroiditis and traumatic injury, including palpation thyroiditis.

Hashimoto's thyroiditis is an autoimmune disorder (autoimmune disease) in which the thyroid gland is infiltrated by the lymphocytes B cell and T cells. These progressively destroy the thyroid gland. In this way, Hashimoto's thyroiditis may have occurred insidiously, and only be noticed when thyroid hormone production decreases, causing symptoms of hypothyroidism. Hashimoto's is more common in females than males, much more common after the age of 60, and has known genetic risk factors. Also more common in individuals with Hashimoto's thyroiditis are Type 1 diabetes, pernicious anaemia, Addison's disease, and vitiligo.

Postpartum thyroiditis occurs sometimes following childbirth. After delivery, the thyroid becomes inflamed and the condition initially presents with a period of hyperthyroidism followed by hypothyroidism and, usually, a return to normal function. The course of the illness takes place over several months, and is characterised by a painless goitre. Antibodies against thyroid peroxidase can be found on testing. The inflammation usually resolves without treatment, although thyroid hormone replacement may be needed during the period of hypothyroidism.

==== Cancer ====
The most common tumor affecting the thyroid is a benign adenoma, usually presenting as a painless mass in the neck. Thyroid cancers are most often carcinomas, although cancer can occur in any tissue that the thyroid consists of, including cancer of C-cells and lymphomas. Cancers from other sites also rarely lodge in the thyroid. Radiation of the head and neck presents a risk factor for thyroid cancer, and cancer is more common in women than men, occurring at a rate of about 2:1.

In most cases, thyroid cancer presents as a painless mass in the neck. It is very unusual for thyroid cancers to present with other symptoms, although in some cases cancer may cause hyperthyroidism. Most thyroid cancers are papillary, followed by follicular, medullary, and thyroid lymphoma. Because of the prominence of the thyroid gland, cancer is often detected earlier in the course of disease as the cause of a nodule, which may undergo fine-needle aspiration. Thyroid function tests will help reveal whether the nodule produces excess thyroid hormones. A radioactive iodine uptake test can help reveal the activity and location of the cancer and metastases.

Thyroid cancers are treated by removing the whole or part of thyroid gland. Radioactive iodine-131 may be given to radioablate the thyroid. Thyroxine is given to replace the hormones lost and to suppress TSH production, as TSH may stimulate recurrence. With the exception of the rare anaplastic thyroid cancer, which carries a very poor prognosis, most thyroid cancers carry an excellent prognosis and can even be considered curable.

==== Congenital ====
A persistent thyroglossal duct is the most common clinically significant birth defect of the thyroid gland. A persistent sinus tract may remain as a vestigial remnant of the tubular development of the thyroid gland. Parts of this tube may be obliterated, leaving small segments to form thyroglossal cysts. Preterm neonates are at risk of hypothyroidism as their thyroid glands are insufficiently developed to meet their postnatal needs. In order to detect hypothyroidism in newborn babies, to prevent growth and development abnormalities in later life, many countries have newborn screening programs at birth.

Infants with thyroid hormone deficiency (congenital hypothyroidism) can manifest problems of physical growth and development as well as brain development, termed cretinism. Children with congenital hypothyroidism are treated supplementally with levothyroxine, which facilitates normal growth and development.

Mucinous, clear secretions may collect within these cysts to form either spherical masses or fusiform swellings, rarely larger than 2 to 3 cm in diameter. These are present in the midline of the neck anterior to the trachea. Segments of the duct and cysts that occur high in the neck are lined by stratified squamous epithelium, which is essentially identical to that covering the posterior portion of the tongue in the region of the foramen cecum. The disorders that occur in the lower neck more proximal to the thyroid gland are lined by epithelium resembling the thyroidal acinar epithelium. Characteristically, next to the lining epithelium, there is an intense lymphocytic infiltrate. Superimposed infection may convert these lesions into abscess cavities, and rarely, give rise to cancers.

Another disorder is that of thyroid dysgenesis which can result in various presentations of one or more misplaced accessory thyroid glands. These can be asymptomatic.

==== Iodine ====
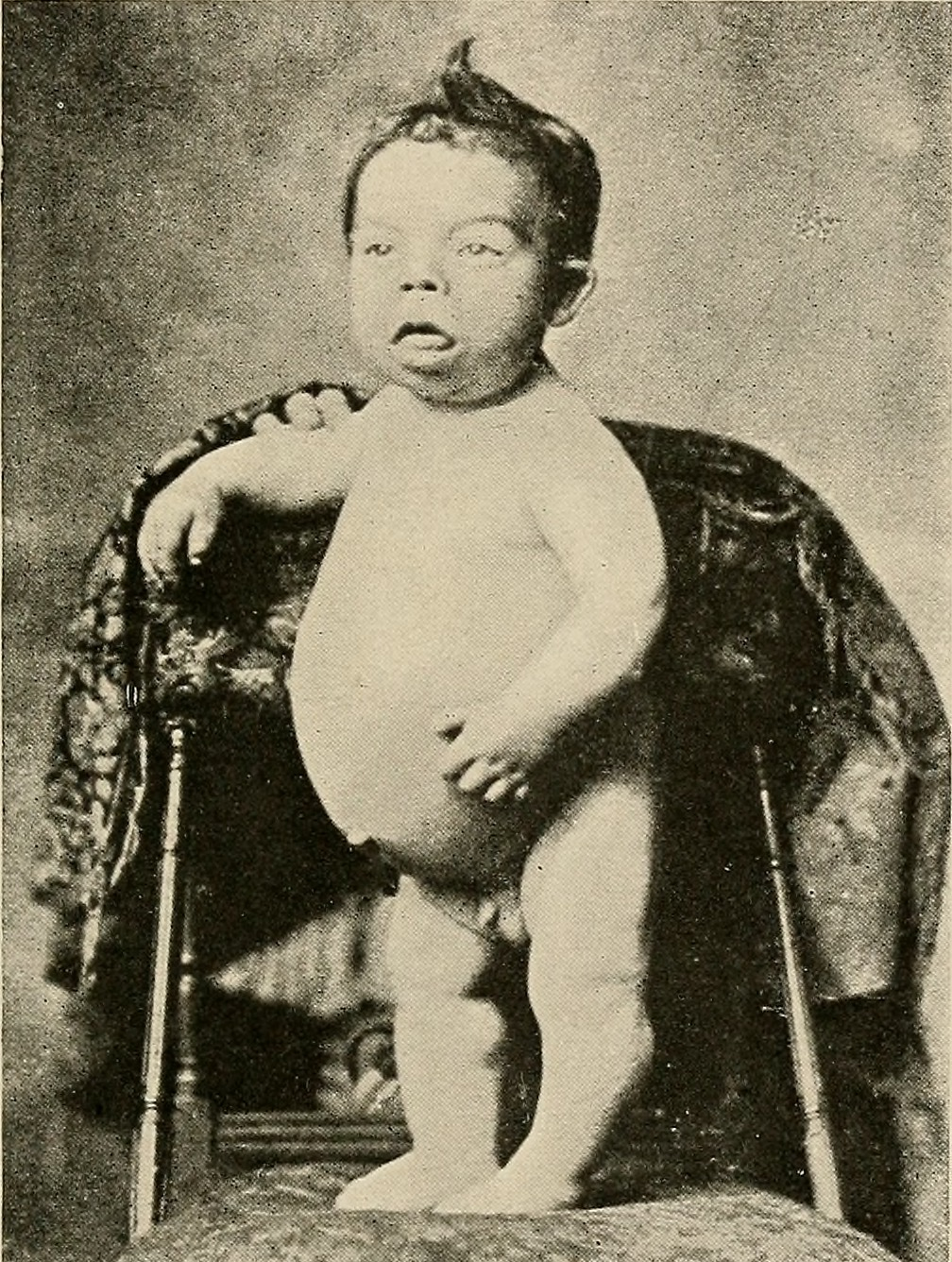
Child affected by Congenital iodine deficiency syndrome, associated with a lack of iodine.

Iodine deficiency, most common in inland and mountainous areas, can predispose to goitre – if widespread, known as endemic goitre. Pregnant women deficient of iodine can give birth to infants with thyroid hormone deficiency. The use of iodised salt to add iodine to the diet has eliminated endemic cretinism in most developed countries, and over 120 countries have made the iodination of salt mandatory.

Because the thyroid concentrates iodine, it also concentrates the various radioactive isotopes of iodine produced by nuclear fission. In the event of large accidental releases of such material into the environment, the uptake of radioactive iodine isotopes by the thyroid can, in theory, be blocked by saturating the uptake mechanism with a large surplus of non-radioactive iodine, taken in the form of potassium iodide tablets. One consequence of the Chernobyl disaster was an increase in thyroid cancers in children in the years following the accident.

Excessive iodine intake is uncommon and usually has no effect on the thyroid function. Sometimes though it may cause hyperthyroidism, and sometimes hypothyroidism with a resulting goitre.

=== Evaluation ===
The thyroid is examined by observation of the gland and surrounding neck for swelling or enlargement. It is then felt, usually from behind, and a person is often asked to swallow to better feel the gland against the fingers of the examiner. The gland moves up and down with swallowing because of its attachments to the thyroid and cricoid cartilages. In a healthy person the gland is not visible yet is palpable as a soft mass. Examination of the thyroid gland includes the search for abnormal masses and the assessment of overall thyroid size. The character of the thyroid, swellings, nodules, and their consistency may all be able to be felt. If a goitre is present, an examiner may also feel down the neck consider tapping the upper part of the chest to check for extension. Further tests may include raising the arms (Pemberton's sign), listening to the gland with a stethoscope for bruits, testing of reflexes, and palpation of the lymph nodes in the head and neck.

An examination of the thyroid will also include observation of the person as a whole, to look for systemic signs such as weight gain or loss, hair loss, and signs in other locations – such as protrusion of the eyes or swelling of the calves in Graves' disease.

=== Tests ===
Thyroid function tests include a battery of blood tests, including the measurement of the thyroid hormones, as well as the measurement of thyroid stimulating hormone (TSH). They may reveal hyperthyroidism (high T_{3} and T_{4}), hypothyroidism (low T_{3}, T_{4}), or subclinical hyperthyroidism (normal T_{3} and T_{4} with a low TSH).

TSH levels are considered the most sensitive marker of thyroid dysfunction. They are however not always accurate, particularly if the cause of hypothyroidism is thought to be related to insufficient thyrotropin releasing hormone (TRH) secretion, in which case it may be low or falsely normal. In such a case a TRH stimulation test, in which TRH is given and TSH levels are measured at 30 and 60-minutes after, may be conducted.

T_{3} and T_{4} can be measured directly. However, as the two thyroid hormones travel bound to other molecules, and it is the "free" component that is biologically active, free T_{3} and free T_{4} levels can be measured. T_{3} is preferred, because in hypothyroidism T_{3} levels may be normal. The ratio of bound to unbound thyroid hormones is known as the thyroid hormone binding ratio (THBR). It is also possible to measure directly the main carriers of the thyroid hormones, thyroglobulin and throxine-binding globulin. Thyroglobulin will also be measurable in a healthy thyroid, and will increase with inflammation, and may also be used to measure the success of thyroid removal or ablation. If successful, thyroglobulin should be undetectable. Lastly, antibodies against components of the thyroid, particularly anti-TPO and anti-thyroglobulin, can be measured. These may be present in normal individuals but are highly sensitive for autoimmune-related disease.

==== Imaging ====
Ultrasound of the thyroid may be used to reveal whether structures are solid or filled with fluid, helping to differentiate between nodules and goitres and cysts. It may also help differentiate between malignant and benign lesions.

When further imaging is required, a radiolabelled iodine-123 or technetium-99 uptake scan may take place. This can determine the size and shape of lesions, reveal whether nodules or goitres are metabolically active, and reveal and monitor sites of thyroid disease or cancer deposits outside the thyroid.

A fine needle aspiration of a sample of thyroid tissue may be taken in order to evaluate a lesion seen on ultrasound which is then sent for histopathology and cytology.

Computed tomography of the thyroid plays an important role in the evaluation of thyroid cancer. CT scans often incidentally find thyroid abnormalities, and thereby practically becomes the first investigation modality.

== History ==
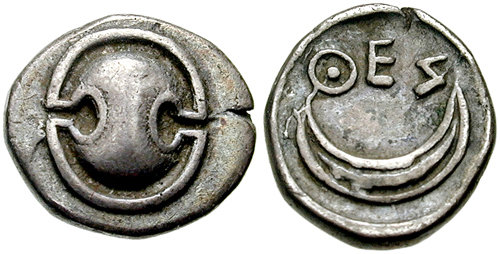
The thyroid was named by Thomas Wharton after the ancient Greek shield of a similar pronunciation. Shown is an example of such a shield, as engraved on a coin dating from 431 to 424 BCE.

The thyroid gland received its modern name in the 1600s, when the anatomist Thomas Wharton likened its shape to that of an Ancient Greek shield or thyos. However, the existence of the gland, and of the diseases associated with it, was known long before then.

=== Antiquity ===
The presence and diseases of the thyroid have been noted and treated for thousands of years. In 1600 BCE burnt sponge and seaweed (which contain iodine) were used within China for the treatment of goitres, a practice which has developed in many parts of the world. In Ayurvedic medicine, the book Sushruta Samhita written about 1400 BCE described hyperthyroidism, hypothyroidism and goitre. Aristotle and Xenophon in the fifth century BCE describe cases of diffuse toxic goitre. Hippocrates and Plato in the fourth century BCE provided some of the first descriptions of the gland itself, proposing its function as a salivary gland. Pliny the Elder in the first century BCE referred to epidemics of goitre in the Alps and proposed treatment with burnt seaweed, a practice also referred to by Galen in the second century, referred to burnt sponge for the treatment of goitre. The Chinese pharmacology text Shennong Ben Cao Jing, written ca. 200–250, also refers to goitre.

=== Scientific era ===
In 1500 polymath Leonardo da Vinci provided the first illustration of the thyroid. In 1543 anatomist Andreas Vesalius gave the first anatomic description and illustration of the gland. In 1656 the thyroid received its modern name, by the anatomist Thomas Wharton. The gland was named thyroid, meaning shield, as its shape resembled the shields commonly used in Ancient Greece. The English name thyroid gland is derived from the medical Latin used by Wharton – glandula thyreoidea. Glandula means 'gland' in Latin, and thyreoidea can be traced back to the Ancient Greek word θυρεοειδής, meaning 'shield-like/shield-shaped'.

French chemist Bernard Courtois discovered iodine in 1811, and in 1896 Eugen Baumann documented it as the central ingredient in the thyroid gland. He did this by boiling the thyroid glands of a thousand sheep, and named the precipitate, a combination of the thyroid hormones, 'iodothyrin'. David Marine in 1907 proved that iodine is necessary for thyroid function.

Graves' disease was described by Robert James Graves in 1834. The role of the thyroid gland in metabolism was demonstrated in 1895 by Adolf Magnus-Levy. Thyroxine was first isolated in 1914 and synthesized in 1927, and triiodothyroxine in 1952. The conversion of T_{4} to T_{3} was discovered in 1970. The process of discovering TSH took place over the early to mid twentieth century. TRH was discovered by Polish endocrinologist Andrew Schally in 1970, contributing in part to his Nobel Prize in Medicine in 1977.

In the nineteenth century numerous authors described both cretinism and myxedema, and their relationship to the thyroid. Charles Mayo coined the term hyperthyroidism in 1910. Hakaru Hashimoto documented a case of Hashimoto's thyroiditis in 1912, antibodies in this disease were demonstrated in 1956. Knowledge of the thyroid and its conditions developed throughout the late nineteenth and twentieth centuries, with many modern treatments and investigative modalities evolving throughout the mid twentieth century, including the use of radioactive iodine, thiouracil and fine needle aspiration.

=== Surgery ===
Either Aetius in the sixth century CE or Persian Ali ibn Abbas al-Magusi in 990 CE conducted the first recorded thyroidectomy as a treatment for goitre. Operations remained risky and generally were not successful until the 19th century, when descriptions emerged from a number of authors including Prussian surgeon Theodor Billroth, Swiss surgeon and physiologist Theodor Kocher, American physician Charles Mayo, American surgeons William Halsted and George Crile. These descriptions provided the basis for modern thyroid surgery. Theodor Kocher went on to win the Nobel Prize in Physiology or Medicine in 1909 "for his work on the physiology, pathology and surgery of the thyroid gland".

== Other animals ==
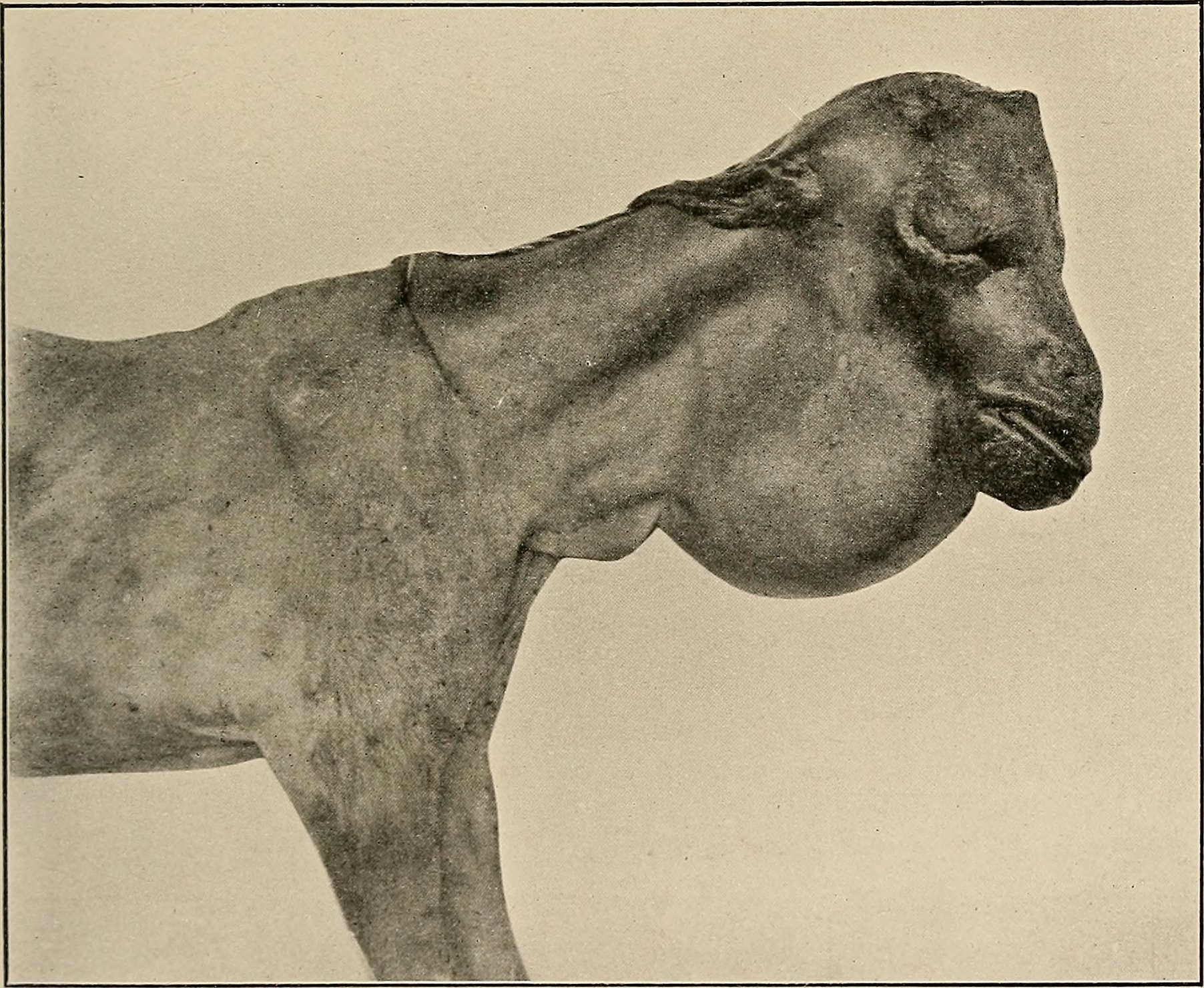
Goat affected by a goitre

The thyroid gland is found in all vertebrates. In fish, it is usually located below the gills and is not always divided into distinct lobes. However, in some teleosts, patches of thyroid tissue are found elsewhere in the body, associated with the kidneys, spleen, heart, or eyes.

In tetrapods, the thyroid is always found somewhere in the neck region. In most tetrapod species, there are two paired thyroid glands – that is, the right and left lobes are not joined. However, there is only ever a single thyroid gland in most mammals, and the shape found in humans is common to many other species.

In larval lampreys, the thyroid originates as an exocrine gland, secreting its hormones into the gut, and associated with the larva's filter-feeding apparatus. In the adult lamprey, the gland separates from the gut, and becomes endocrine, but this path of development may reflect the evolutionary origin of the thyroid. For instance, the closest living relatives of vertebrates, the tunicates and amphioxi (lancelets), have a structure very similar to that of larval lampreys (the endostyle), and this also secretes iodine-containing compounds, though not thyroxine.

Thyroxine is critical to metabolic regulation, and growth throughout the vertebrate clade. Iodine and T_{4} trigger the change from a plant-eating water-dwelling tadpole into a meat-eating land-dwelling frog, with better neurological, visuospatial, smell and cognitive abilities for hunting, as seen in other predatory animals. A similar phenomenon happens in the neotenic amphibian salamanders, which, without introducing iodine, do not transform into land-dwelling adults, and live and reproduce in the larval form of aquatic axolotl. Among amphibians, administering a thyroid-blocking agent such as propylthiouracil (PTU) can prevent tadpoles from metamorphosing into frogs; in contrast, administering thyroxine will trigger metamorphosis. In amphibian metamorphosis, thyroxine and iodine also exert a well-studied experimental model of apoptosis on the cells of gills, tail, and fins of tadpoles. Iodine, via iodolipids, has favored the evolution of terrestrial animal species and has likely played a crucial role in the evolution of the human brain.

== See also ==
- Desiccated thyroid
- Thyroid disease in pregnancy
