= Sodium/iodide cotransporter =

Mammalian protein found in Homo sapiens

SLC5A5

Identifiers
- Aliases: SLC5A5, NIS, TDH1, solute carrier family 5 member 5
- External IDs: OMIM: 601843; MGI: 2149330; GeneCards: SLC5A5

Gene location (Human)
Chr.	Chromosome 19 (human)
Band	19p13.11	Start	17,871,945 bp
Band	19p13.11	End	17,895,174 bp

Gene location (Mouse)
Chr.	Chromosome 8 (mouse)
Band	8|8 B3.3	Start	71,335,533 bp
Band	8|8 B3.3	End	71,345,401 bp
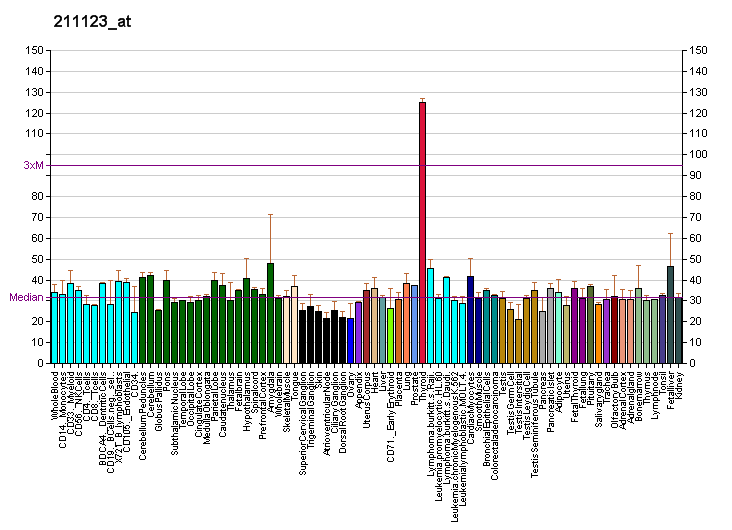
RNA expression pattern
Bgee	Human / Mouse (ortholog); Top expressed in: gastric mucosa; deltoid muscle; mucosa of ileum; tibialis anterior muscle; body of stomach; testicle; pharynx; gonad; salivary gland; tonsil / Top expressed in: epithelium of stomach; lumbar spinal ganglion; facial motor nucleus; submandibular gland; pyloric antrum; supraoptic nucleus; gastrula; Epithelium of choroid plexus; embryo; primary visual cortex; More reference expression data
BioGPS	More reference expression data
Gene ontology
Molecular function	transporter activity; symporter activity; iodide transmembrane transporter activity; sodium:iodide symporter activity; transmembrane transporter activity
Cellular component	integral component of membrane; extracellular vesicle; membrane; extracellular exosome; nucleus; plasma membrane
Biological process	sodium ion transmembrane transport; sodium ion transport; ion transport; anion transmembrane transport; cellular response to gonadotropin stimulus; cellular response to cAMP; transmembrane transport; thyroid hormone generation; iodide transport; transport
Sources:Amigo / QuickGO
Orthologs
Databases	NCBI: entry; OMA: entry
Species	Human	Mouse
Entrez	6528	114479
Ensembl	ENSG00000105641	ENSMUSG00000000792
UniProt	Q92911	Q99PN0
RefSeq (mRNA)	NM_000453	NM_053248
RefSeq (protein)	NP_000444	NP_444478
Location (UCSC)	Chr 19: 17.87 – 17.9 Mb	Chr 8: 71.34 – 71.35 Mb
PubMed search
- Wikidata
View/Edit Human	View/Edit Mouse

The sodium/iodide cotransporter, also known as the sodium/iodide symporter (NIS), is a protein that in humans is encoded by the SLC5A5 gene. It is a transmembrane glycoprotein with a molecular weight of 87 kDa and 13 transmembrane domains, which transports two sodium cations (Na^{+}) for each iodide anion (I^{−}) into the cell. NIS mediated uptake of iodide into follicular cells of the thyroid gland is the first step in the synthesis of thyroid hormone.

== Iodine uptake ==
Iodine uptake mediated by thyroid follicular cells from the blood plasma is the first step for the synthesis of thyroid hormones. This ingested iodine is bound to serum proteins, especially to albumins. The rest of the iodine which remains unlinked and free in bloodstream, is removed from the body through urine (the kidney is essential in the removal of iodine from extracellular space).

Iodine uptake is a result of an active transport mechanism mediated by the NIS protein, which is found in the basolateral membrane of thyroid follicular cells. As a result of this active transport, iodide concentration inside follicular cells of thyroid tissue is 20 to 50 times higher than in the plasma. The transport of iodide across the cell membrane is driven by the electrochemical gradient of sodium (the intracellular concentration of sodium is approximately 12 mM and extracellular concentration 140 mM). Once inside the follicular cells, the iodide diffuses to the apical membrane, where it is metabolically oxidized through the action of thyroid peroxidase to iodinium (I^{+}) which in turn iodinates tyrosine residues of the thyroglobulin proteins in the follicle colloid. Thus, NIS is essential for the synthesis of thyroid hormones (T_{3} and T_{4}).

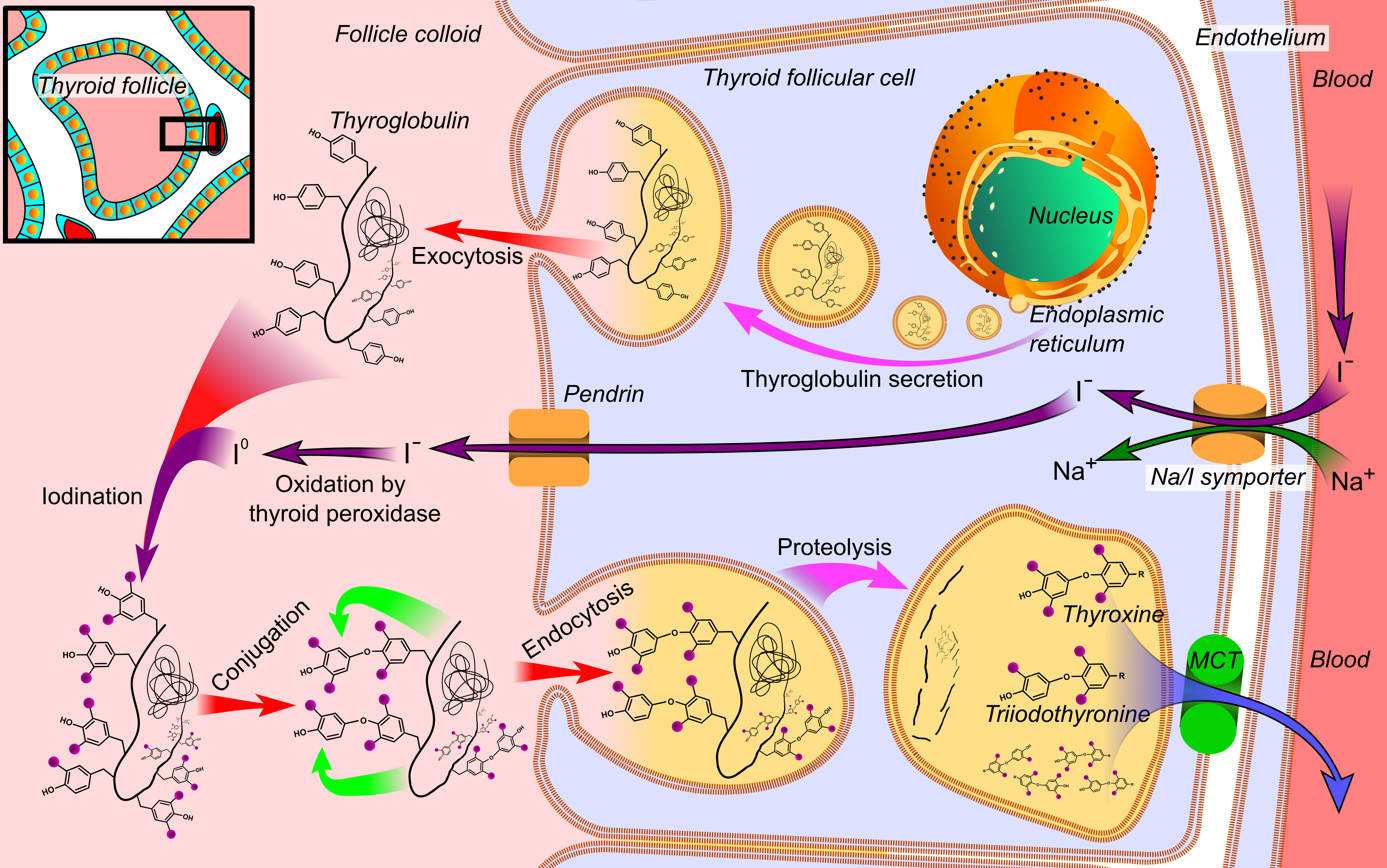
Thyroid hormone synthesis, with the Na/I symporter seen at right.

Apart from thyroid cells NIS can also be found, although less expressed, in other tissues such as the salivary glands, the gastric mucosa, the kidney, the placenta, the ovaries and the mammary glands during pregnancy and lactation. NIS expression in the mammary glands is quite a relevant fact since the regulation of iodide absorption and its presence in the breast milk is the main source of iodine for a newborn. Note that the regulation of NIS expression in thyroid is done by the thyroid-stimulating hormone (TSH), whereas in breast is done by a combination of three molecules: prolactin, oxytocin and β-estradiol.

== Inhibition by Environmental Chemicals ==
Some anions like perchlorate, pertechnetate and thiocyanate, can affect iodide capture by competitive inhibition because they can use the symporter when their concentration in plasma is high, even though they have less affinity for NIS than iodide has. Many plant cyanogenic glycosides, which are important pesticides, also act via inhibition of NIS in a large part of animal cells of herbivores and parasites and not in plant cells. Some evidence suggests that fluoride, such as that present in drinking water, may decrease cellular expression of the sodium/iodide symporter.

A validated in vitro radioactive iodide uptake (RAIU) assay suggested that besides the traditionally known anions such as perchlorate, organic chemicals may also pose inhibition of iodide uptake via NIS.

== Regulation in iodine uptake ==
The iodine transport mechanisms are closely submitted to the regulation of NIS expression. There are two kinds of regulation on NIS expression: positive and negative regulation. Positive regulation depends on TSH, which acts by transcriptional and posttranslational mechanisms. On the other hand, negative regulation depends on the plasmatic concentrations of iodide.

=== Transcriptional regulation ===
At a transcriptional level, TSH regulates the thyroid's function through cAMP. TSH first binds to its receptors which are joined to G proteins, and then induces the activation of the enzyme adenylate cyclase, which will raise the intracellular levels of cAMP. This can activate the CREB transcription factor (cAMP Response Element-Binding) that will bind to the CRE (cAMP Responsive Element). However, this might not occur and, instead, the increase in cAMP can be followed by PKA (Protein kinase A) activation and, as a result, the activation of the transcription factor Pax8 after phosphorylation.

These two transcription factors influence the activity of NUE (NIS Upstream Enhancer), which is essential for initiating transcription of NIS. NUE's activity depends on 4 relevant sites which have been identified by mutational analysis. The transcriptional factor Pax8 binds in two of these sites. Pax8 mutations lead to a decrease in the transcriptional activity of NUE. Another binding-site is the CRE, where the CREB binds, taking part in NIS transcription.

In contrast, growth factors such as IGF-1 and TGF-β (which is induced by the BRAF-V600E oncogene) suppress NIS gene expression, not letting NIS localize in the membrane.

=== Posttranslational regulation ===
The TSH can also regulate the iodide uptake at a posttranslational level, since, if it's absent, the NIS can be resorted from the basolateral membrane of the cell in to the cytoplasm where it is no longer functional. Therefore, the iodide uptake is reduced.

== Thyroid diseases ==
The lack of iodide transport inside follicular cells tends to cause goitres. There are some mutations in the NIS DNA that cause hypothyroidism and thyroid dyshormonogenesis.

Moreover, antibodies anti-NIS have been found in thyroid autoimmune diseases. Using RT-PCR tests, it has been proved that there is no expression of NIS in cancer cells (which forms a thyroid carcinoma). Nevertheless, thanks to immunohistochemical techniques it is known that NIS is not functional in these cells, since it is mainly localized in the cytosol, and not in the basolateral membrane.

There is also a connection between the V600E mutation of the BRAF oncogene and papillary thyroid cancer that cannot concentrate iodine into its follicular cells.

== Use with radioiodine (^{131}I) ==
The main goal for the treatment of non-thyroid carcinoma is the research of less aggressive procedures that could also provide less toxicity. One of these therapies is based on transferring NIS in cancer cells of different origin (breast, colon, prostate...) using adenoviruses or retroviruses (viral vectors). This genetic technique is called gene targeting. Once NIS is transferred in these cells, the patient is treated with radioiodine (^{131}I), being the result a low cancer cell survival rate. Therefore, a lot is expected from these therapies.

== See also ==
- Symporter
- Solute carrier family
