= Thyroid dysgenesis =

Malformation or misplacement of the thyroid

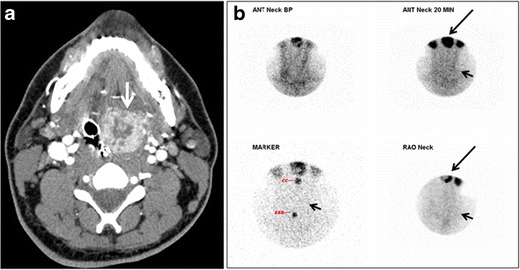
- CT scan and scintigraphy images of lingular ectopic thyroid
- Specialty: Endocrinology

Thyroid dysgenesis is a cause of congenital hypothyroidism where the thyroid is missing (thyroid agenesis), ectopic, or severely underdeveloped. It should not be confused with iodine deficiency, or with other forms of congenital hypothyroidism, such as thyroid dyshormonogenesis, where the thyroid is present but not functioning correctly.

Congenital hypothyroidism caused by thyroid dysgenesis can be associated with PAX8.

== Ectopic thyroid ==
An ectopic thyroid, also called accessory thyroid gland, is a form of thyroid dysgenesis in which an entire or parts of the thyroid located in another part of the body than what is the usual case. A completely ectopic thyroid gland may be located anywhere along the path of the descent of the thyroid during its embryological development, although it is most commonly located at the base of the tongue, just posterior to the foramen cecum of the tongue. In this location, an aberrant or ectopic thyroid gland is known as a lingual thyroid. If the thyroid fails to descend to even higher degree, then the resulting final resting point of the thyroid gland may be high in the neck, such as just below the hyoid bone. Parts of ectopic thyroid tissue ("accessory thyroid tissue") can also occur, and arises from remnants of the thyroglossal duct, and may appear anywhere along its original length. Accessory thyroid tissue may be functional, but is generally insufficient for normal function if the main thyroid gland is entirely removed.

Lingual thyroid is 4-7 times more common in females, with symptoms developing during puberty, pregnancy or menopause. Lingual thyroid may be asymptomatic, or give symptoms such as dysphagia (difficulty swallowing), dysphonia (difficulty talking) and dyspnea (difficulty breathing).
