= PAX8 =

Mammalian protein found in humans

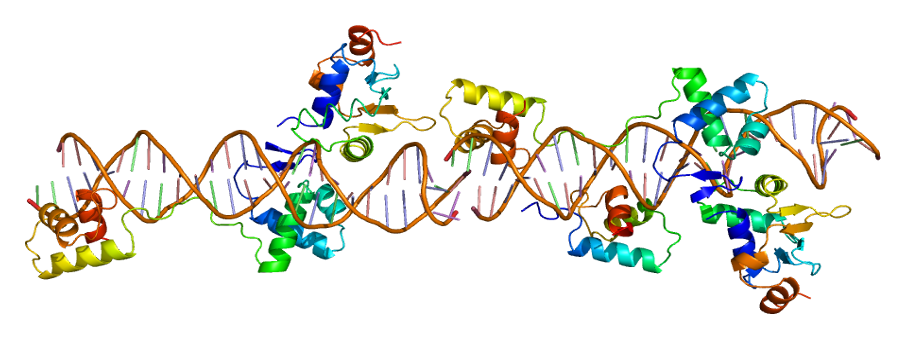

Identifiers
- Aliases: PAX8, paired box 8, PAX-8
- External IDs: OMIM: 167415; MGI: 97492; GeneCards: PAX8
Available structures
PDB	Ortholog search: PDBe RCSB
PDB	List of PDB id codes 2K27

Gene location (Human)
Chr.	Chromosome 2 (human)
Band	2q14.1	Start	113,215,997 bp
Band	2q14.1	End	113,278,921 bp

Gene location (Mouse)
Chr.	Chromosome 2 (mouse)
Band	2 A3|2 16.43 cM	Start	24,310,572 bp
Band	2 A3|2 16.43 cM	End	24,365,611 bp
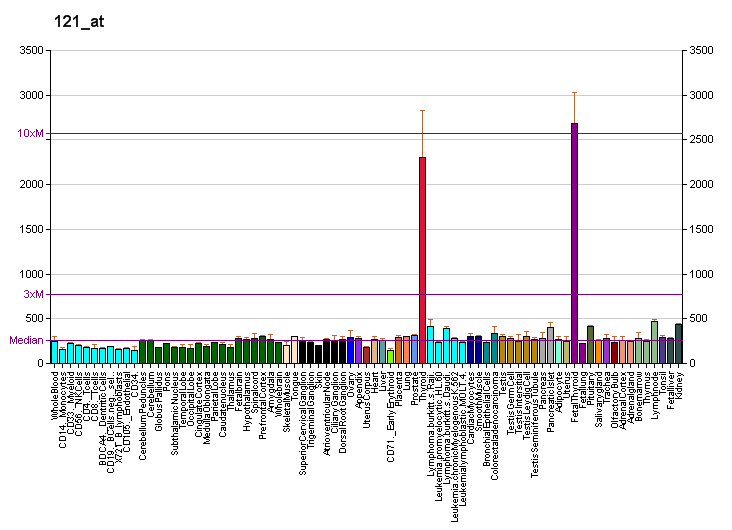

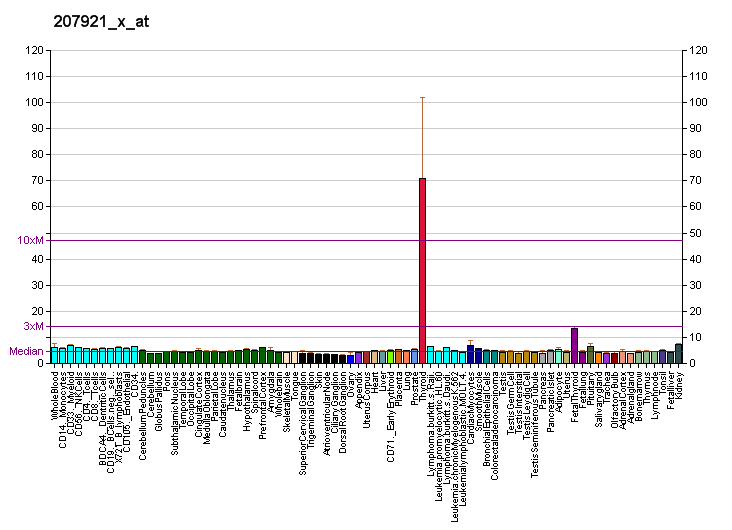

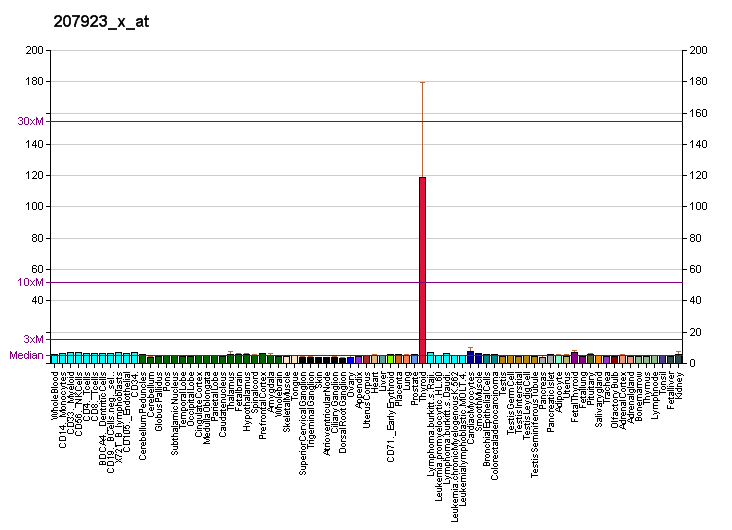
RNA expression pattern
Bgee	Human / Mouse (ortholog); Top expressed in: right lobe of thyroid gland; left lobe of thyroid gland; right uterine tube; renal medulla; caput epididymis; corpus epididymis; human kidney; tail of epididymis; tibialis anterior muscle; mucosa of ileum / Top expressed in: thyroid gland; right kidney; proximal tubule; inner renal medulla; connecting tubule; human kidney; lumbar subsegment of spinal cord; inner stripe of outer renal medulla; uterus; otic pit; More reference expression data
BioGPS	More reference expression data
Gene ontology
Molecular function	DNA binding; sequence-specific DNA binding; DNA-binding transcription factor activity; DNA-binding transcription activator activity, RNA polymerase II-specific; RNA polymerase II cis-regulatory region sequence-specific DNA binding; thyroid-stimulating hormone receptor activity; protein binding; RNA polymerase II core promoter sequence-specific DNA binding; DNA-binding transcription factor activity, RNA polymerase II-specific
Cellular component	nucleoplasm; nucleus
Biological process	regulation of apoptotic process; pronephros development; regulation of metanephric nephron tubule epithelial cell differentiation; cell differentiation; mesonephric tubule development; positive regulation of branching involved in ureteric bud morphogenesis; kidney epithelium development; regulation of transcription, DNA-templated; positive regulation of metanephric DCT cell differentiation; negative regulation of mesenchymal cell apoptotic process involved in metanephric nephron morphogenesis; negative regulation of apoptotic process involved in metanephric collecting duct development; kidney development; pronephric field specification; positive regulation of mesenchymal to epithelial transition involved in metanephros morphogenesis; anatomical structure morphogenesis; metanephric epithelium development; mesenchymal to epithelial transition involved in metanephros morphogenesis; transcription by RNA polymerase II; regulation of thyroid-stimulating hormone secretion; transcription, DNA-templated; otic vesicle development; metanephric distal convoluted tubule development; negative regulation of mesenchymal cell apoptotic process involved in metanephros development; mesonephros development; positive regulation of transcription, DNA-templated; metanephric nephron tubule formation; multicellular organism development; central nervous system development; metanephric comma-shaped body morphogenesis; branching involved in ureteric bud morphogenesis; thyroid gland development; positive regulation of thyroid hormone generation; negative regulation of apoptotic process involved in metanephric nephron tubule development; S-shaped body morphogenesis; inner ear morphogenesis; urogenital system development; sulfur compound metabolic process; metanephric S-shaped body morphogenesis; metanephros development; cellular response to gonadotropin stimulus; positive regulation of transcription by RNA polymerase II; thyroid-stimulating hormone signaling pathway; negative regulation of cardiac muscle cell apoptotic process; ventricular septum development
Sources:Amigo / QuickGO
Orthologs
Databases	NCBI: entry; OMA: entry
Species	Human	Mouse
Entrez	7849	18510
Ensembl	ENSG00000125618	ENSMUSG00000026976
UniProt	Q06710	Q00288
RefSeq (mRNA)	NM_003466; NM_013951; NM_013952; NM_013953; NM_013992	NM_011040
RefSeq (protein)	NP_003457; NP_039246; NP_039247; NP_054698	NP_035170
Location (UCSC)	Chr 2: 113.22 – 113.28 Mb	Chr 2: 24.31 – 24.37 Mb
PubMed search
- Wikidata
View/Edit Human	View/Edit Mouse

Paired box gene 8, also known as PAX8, is a protein which in humans is encoded by the PAX8 gene.

== Function ==
This gene is a member of the paired box (PAX) family of transcription factors. Members of this gene family typically encode proteins which contain a paired box domain, an octapeptide, and a paired-type homeodomain. The PAX gene family has an important role in the formation of tissues and organs during embryonic development and maintaining the normal function of some cells after birth. The PAX genes give instructions for making proteins that attach themselves to certain areas of DNA. This nuclear protein is involved in thyroid follicular cell development and expression of thyroid-specific genes. PAX8 releases the hormones important for regulating growth, brain development, and metabolism. Also functions in very early stages of kidney organogenesis, the Müllerian system, and the thymus. Additionally, PAX8 is expressed in the renal excretory system, epithelial cells of the endocervix, endometrium, ovary, fallopian tube, seminal vesicle, epididymis, pancreatic islet cells and lymphoid cells. PAX8 and other transcription factors play a role in binding to DNA and regulating the genes that drive thyroid hormone synthesis (Tg, TPO, Slc5a5 and Tshr).

PAX8 (and PAX2) is one of the important regulators of urogenital system morphogenesis. They play a role in the specification of the first renal cells of the embryo and remain essential players throughout development.

PAX8 has been shown to interact with NK2 homeobox 1.

== Clinical significance ==
The PAX8 gene is also associated congenital hypothyroidism due to thyroid dysgenesis because of its role in growth and development of the thyroid gland. A mutation in the PAX8 gene could prevent or disrupt normal development. These mutations can affect different functions of the protein including DNA binding, gene activation, protein stability, and cooperation with the co-activator p300. PAX gene deficiencies can result in development defects called Congenital Anomalies of the Kidney and Urinary Tract (CAKUT).

=== Cancer ===
PAX8 mutations are associated with various forms of cancer.

==== Mechanisms ====
PAX8 is considered a "master regulator transcription factor". As a master regulator, it is possible that it regulates expression of genes other than thyroid-specific. Several known tumor suppressor genes like TP53 and WT1 have been identified as transcriptional targets in human astrocytoma cells. Over 90% of thyroid tumors arise from follicular thyroid cells. A fusion protein, PAX8-PPAR-γ, is implicated in some follicular thyroid carcinomas and follicular-variant papillary thyroid carcinoma. The mechanism for this transformation is not well understood, but there are several proposed possibilities.

- Inhibition of normal PPARy function by chimeric PAX8/PPARy protein through a dominant negative effect
- Activation of normal PPARy targets due to the over expression of the chimeric protein that contain all functional domains of wild-type PPAR y
- Deregulation of PAX8 function
- Activation of a set of genes unrelated to both wild-type PPARy and wild-type PAX8 pathways

The PAX 8 gene has some association with follicular thyroid tumors. It has been observed that PAX8/PPAR y-positive tumors rarely express RAS mutations in combination. This suggests that follicular carcinomas develop in two distinct pathways either with PAX8/PPAR y or RAS.

Alternate transcriptional splice variants, encoding different isoforms, have been characterized. The mechanism of switching on the genes is unknown. Some studies have suggested that the renal PAX genes act as pro-survival factors and allow tumor cells to resist apoptosis. Down regulation of the PAX gene expression inhibits cell growth and induces apoptosis. This could be a possible avenue for therapeutic targets in renal cancer.

Some whole-genome sequencing studies have shown that PAX8 also targets BRCA1 (carcinogenesis), MAPK pathways (thyroid malignancies), and Ccnb1 and Ccnb2 (cell-cycle processes). PAX8 is shown to be involved in tumor cell proliferation and differentiation, signal transduction, apoptosis, cell polarity and transport, cell motility and adhesion.

==== Associated cancer types ====
Mutations in this gene have been associated with thyroid dysgenesis, thyroid follicular carcinomas and atypical follicular thyroid adenomas.

PAX8/PPARy rearrangement account for 30-40% of conventional type follicular carcinomas., and less than 5% of oncocytic carcinomas (aka Hurthle-Cell Neoplasms).

Expression of PAX8 is increased in neoplastic renal tissues, Wilms tumors, ovarian cancer and Müllerian carcinomas. For this reason, the immunodetection of PAX8 is widely used for diagnosing primary and metastatic renal tumors. Re-activation of PAX8 (or Pax2) expression has been reported in pediatric Wilms Tumors, almost all subtypes of renal cell carcinoma, nephrogenic adenomas, ovarian cancer cells, bladder, prostate, and endometrial carcinomas. Expression of PAX8 is also induced during the development of cervical cancer.

Tumors expressing the PAX8/PPARy are usually present in at a young age, small in size, present in a solid/nested growth pattern and frequently involve vascular invasion.

== See also ==
- Pax genes
