= Palpation thyroiditis =

Thyroid inflammation due to mechanical stress

Palpation thyroiditis refers to the development of thyroid inflammation due to mechanical damage to thyroid follicles. This can occur by vigorous repeated palpation (as with thyroid examination) or surgical manipulation (as can occur with radical neck dissection). It is a type of subacute thyroiditis. Pathology shows multifocal granulomatous folliculitis. T cells predominate compared to B cells. There may be initial transient hyperthyroidism due to leakage of preformed thyroid hormone in blood.
