= Pendred syndrome =

- Other names: Goiter-deafness syndrome
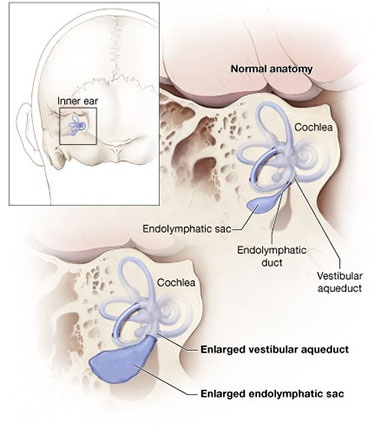
- The normal cochlea has 2 & a half turns, but, in Pendred Syndrome, there is abnormal partitioning (the central bony core is reduced in size and complexity)and a reduced number of turns leading to a Mondini cochlea which has a basal turn and a dilated apical turn (1 & a half turns). There is also a dilated endolymphatic duct and sac with a widened vestibular aqueduct
- Specialty: Endocrinology
- Named after: Vaughan Pendred

Pendred syndrome is a genetic disorder leading to congenital bilateral sensorineural hearing loss and goitre with euthyroid or mild hypothyroidism. There is no specific treatment, other than supportive measures for the hearing loss and thyroid hormone supplementation in case of hypothyroidism. It is named after Vaughan Pendred (1869–1946), the British doctor who first described the condition in an Irish family living in Durham in 1896. It accounts for 7.5% to 15% of all cases of congenital deafness.

== Signs and symptoms ==
The hearing loss of Pendred syndrome is often, although not always, present from birth, and language acquisition may be a significant problem if deafness is severe in childhood. The hearing loss typically worsens over the years, and progression can be step-wise and related to minor head trauma. In some cases, language development worsens after head injury, demonstrating that the inner ear is sensitive to trauma in Pendred syndrome; this is as a consequence of the widened vestibular aqueducts usual in this syndrome. Vestibular function varies in Pendred syndrome and vertigo can be a feature of minor head trauma. A goitre is present in 75% of all cases.

== Genetics ==
Pendred syndrome has an autosomal recessive pattern of inheritance.

Pendred syndrome is inherited in an autosomal recessive manner, meaning that one would need to inherit an abnormal gene from each parent to develop the condition. This also means that a sibling of a patient with Pendred syndrome has a 25% chance of also having the condition if the parents are unaffected carriers.

It has been linked to mutations in the PDS gene, which codes for the pendrin protein (solute carrier family 26, member 4, SLC26A4). The gene is located on the long arm of chromosome 7 (7q31). Mutations in the same gene also cause enlarged vestibular aqueduct syndrome (EVA or EVAS), another congenital cause of deafness; specific mutations are more likely to cause EVAS, while others are more linked with Pendred syndrome.

== Pathophysiology ==
SLC26A4 can be found in the cochlea (part of the inner ear), thyroid and the kidney. In the kidney, it participates in the secretion of bicarbonate. However, Pendred syndrome is not known to lead to kidney problems. It functions as an iodide/chloride transporter. In the thyroid, this leads to reduced organification of iodine (i.e. its incorporation into thyroid hormone).

== Diagnosis ==
People with Pendred syndrome present with a hearing loss either at birth or during childhood. The hearing loss is commonly progressive. In early stages it is usually a mixed hearing loss (both conductive and sensorineural hearing loss) because of a third window effect due to the inner ear malformation (widened vestibular aqueducts). A thyroid goitre may be present in the first decade and is usual towards the end of the second decade. MRI scanning of the inner ear usually shows widened or large vestibular aqueducts with enlarged endolymphatic sacs and may show abnormalities of the cochleae that are known as Mondini dysplasia. Genetic testing to identify the pendrin gene usually establishes the diagnosis. If the condition is suspected, a "perchlorate discharge test" is sometimes performed. This test is highly sensitive, but may also be abnormal in other thyroid conditions. If a goitre is present, thyroid function tests are performed to identify mild cases of thyroid dysfunction even if they are not yet causing symptoms.

== Treatment ==
No specific treatment exists for Pendred syndrome. If thyroid hormone levels are decreased, thyroid hormone supplements may be required. Patients are advised to take precautions against head injury.
