= Thyroid follicular cell =

Hormone-producing cell in the thyroid gland

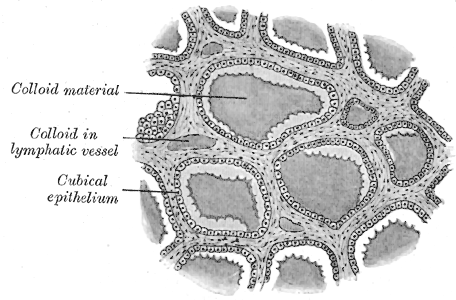
- Section of thyroid gland of sheep. X 160. ("Cubical epithelium" labeled at center left.)

Details
- System: Endocrine system
- Location: Thyroid gland
- Function: Production and secretion of thyroid hormones thyroxine (T_{4}) and triiodothyronine (T_{3}).

Identifiers
- TH: H3.08.02.4.00007
- FMA: 68782

Thyroid follicular cells (also called thyroid epithelial cells or thyrocytes) are the major cell type in the thyroid gland, and are responsible for the production and secretion of the thyroid hormones thyroxine (T_{4}) and triiodothyronine (T_{3}). They form the single layer of cuboidal epithelium that makes up the outer structure of the almost spherical thyroid follicle.

== Structure ==
=== Location ===
Thyroid follicular cells form a simple cuboidal epithelium and are arranged in spherical thyroid follicles surrounding a fluid filled space known as the colloid. The interior space formed by the follicular cells is known as the follicular lumen. The basolateral membrane of follicular cells contains thyrotropin receptors which bind to thyroid-stimulating hormone (TSH) found circulating in the blood.

Calcitonin-producing parafollicular cells are also found along the basement membrane of the thyroid follicle, interspersed between follicular cells; and in spaces between the spherical follicles. Parafollicular cells can be distinguished from follicular cells based on their lighter staining cytoplasm using H&E.

=== Development ===
Their embryologic origin is from a median endodermal mass in the region of the tongue (foramen cecum) in contrast to parafollicular cells which arise from the 4th pharyngeal pouch.

== Function ==
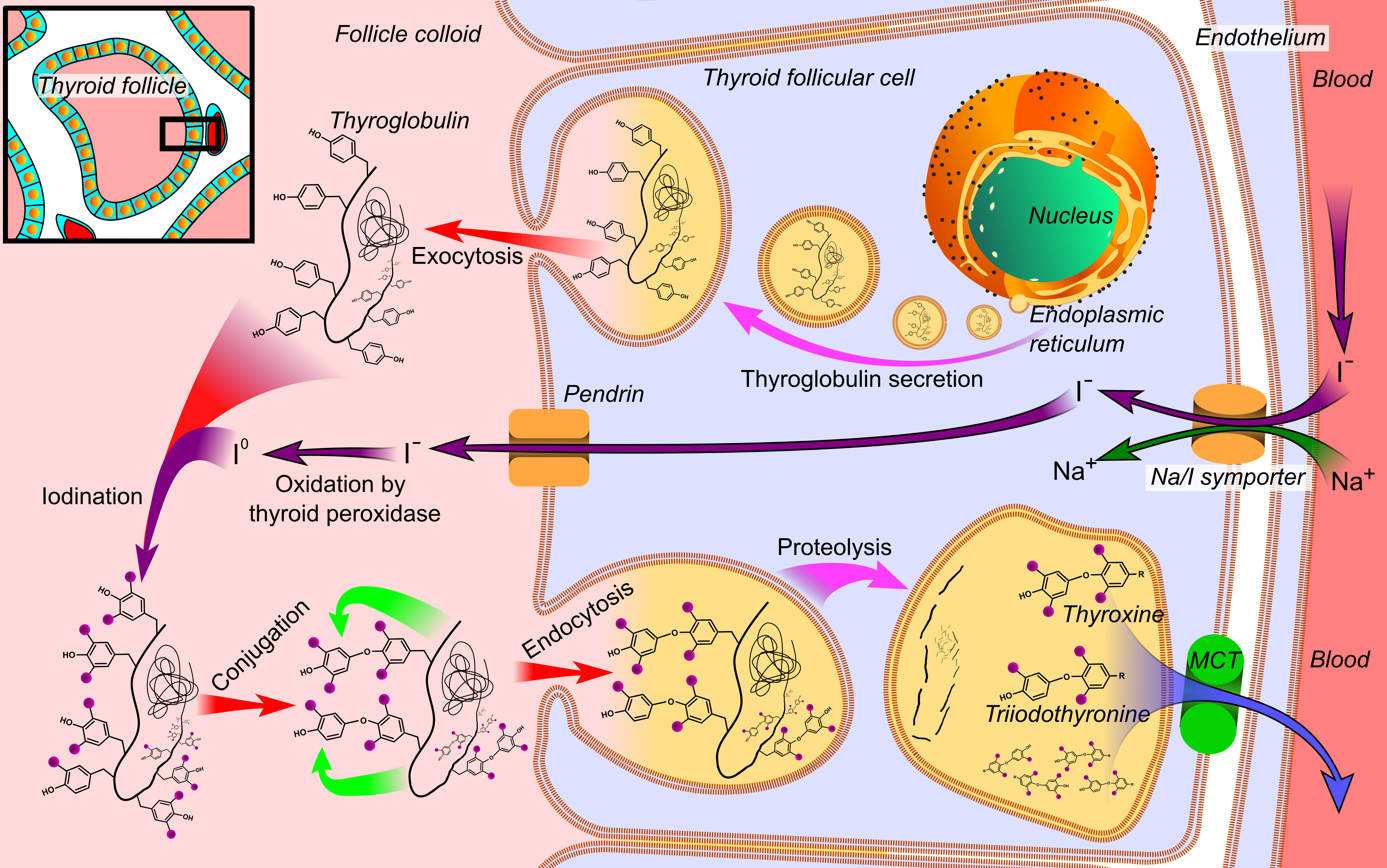
Thyroid hormone synthesis.

Follicular cells take up iodide and amino acids from the blood circulation on the basolateral side, synthesize thyroglobulin and thyroperoxidase from amino acids and secrete these into the thyroid follicles together with iodide. The follicular cells subsequently take up iodinated thyroglobulin from the follicles by endocytosis, extract thyroid hormones from it with the help of proteases and subsequently release thyroid hormones into the blood.

These thyroid hormones are transported throughout the body where they control metabolism (which is the conversion of oxygen and carbohydrates to energy). Every cell in the body depends upon thyroid hormones for regulation of their metabolism. The normal thyroid gland produces about 80% T_{4} and about 20% T_{3}, however, T_{3} is about four times as potent as T_{4}.

=== Iodide transport ===
The transport of iodide into follicular cells is vital for the synthesis of the iodine containing thyroid hormones. Iodide is actively transported at the basolateral membrane of follicular cells by the sodium-iodide symporter. At the apical membrane iodide is secreted into the colloid by the chloride/iodide transporter pendrin.

== See also ==
- Thyroid diverticulum
- List of human cell types derived from the germ layers
- List of distinct cell types in the adult human body
