= Adolf Magnus-Levy =

German-American physician and physiologist

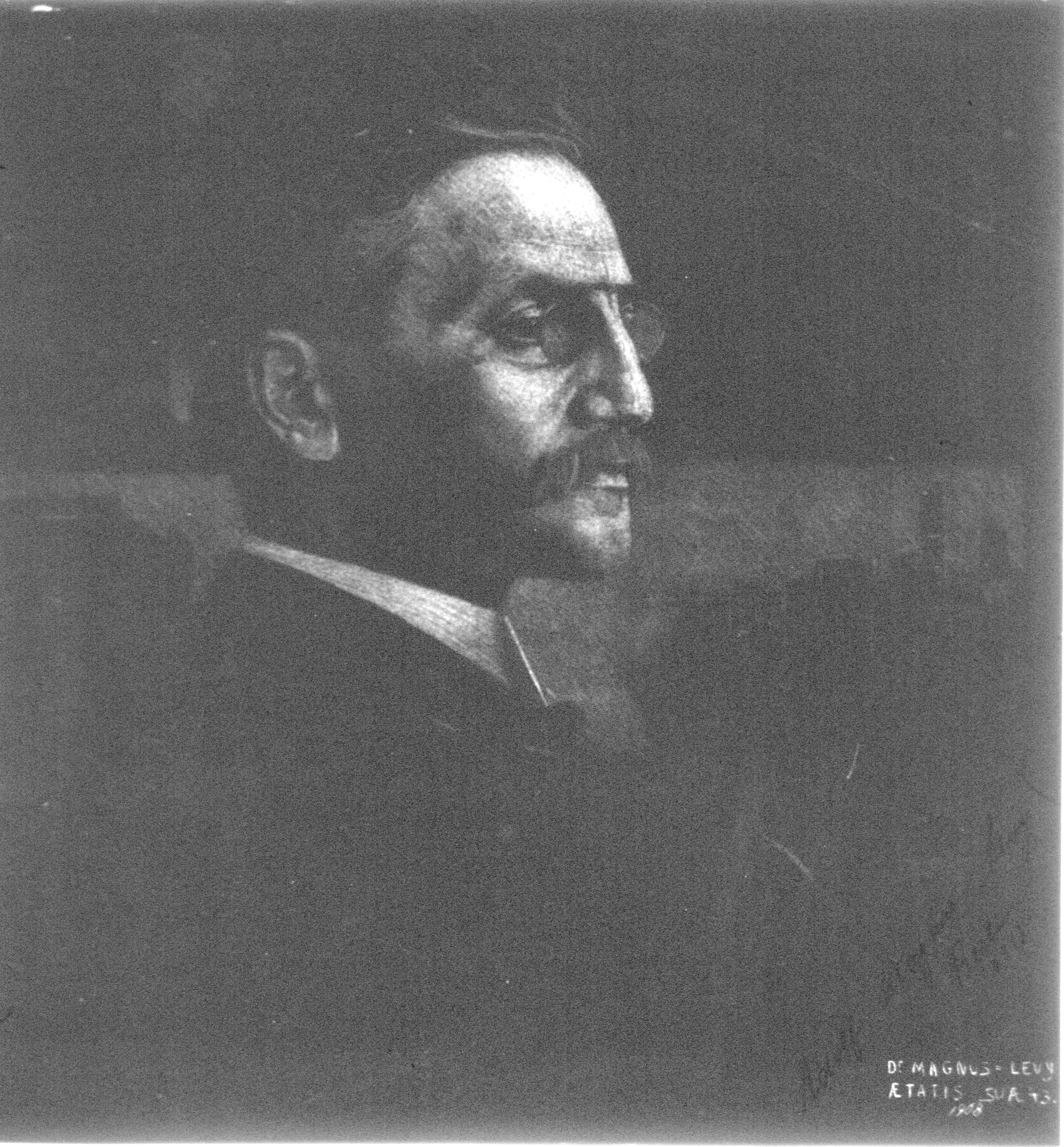
Portrait c. 1908

Adolf Magnus-Levy (September 10, 1865 – February 5, 1955) was a German physician and physiologist who studied human metabolism and diseases associated with it. He took a special interest in studies of diabetes, goitre, and myeloma. Being of Jewish origin, he escaped Nazi persecution and became a citizen of the United States of America in 1940 and served as a professor at Yale University.

Magnus-Levy was born in Berlin, Kingdom of Prussia and went to study medicine at the University of Berlin. Several of his near family died from infectious disease and his mother suffered diabetes and although initially inspired to study history after meeting Theodor Mommsen he went on to study medicine at Berlin, Heidelberg, and Erlangen. He was inspired by the lectures of Franz Hofmeister and Karl Ludwig and after receiving an MD from Heidelberg in 1890 he sought to study physiology. He then studied under Nathan Zuntz in Berlin, studying gas exchange and then energetics under Eugen Baumann in Freiburg. In Berlin he worked with Albert Fränkel and at Frankfurt with Carl von Noorden. He began to take a special interest in obesity, diabetes, and myxedema. He published on the influence of the thyroid on respiration in 1895. He studied diabetic acidosis in Strassburg along with Bernhard Naunyn. He became an instructor (privatdozent) with a thesis on Oxybutyric Acid and its Relation to the Diabetic Coma (1899) and joined the University of Berlin in 1905. He worked as a chief of medical service in Berlin from 1910 to 1922. He published several works while working in Berlin including The Physiology of Metabolism (1908), Chemical Problems of Diabetes (1910), and Acids and Bases in Disease (1930). Being from a Jewish family, he lost his position after the Nazis came to power and in 1940 he moved with his family to the United States of America and he became a professor at Yale University. Here he worked on the use of isotopes for studying human metabolism. In later life, he wrote on the history of medicine in Germany. Among his studies on basal metabolic rate, he found that his own BMR had declined by 10% from the age of 26 to 76.

Magnus-Levy died in New York. He had prepared a letter that he wrote to be read at his funeral in which he thanked his family, John Farquhar Fulton, the home that cared for him in old age, the United States of America, the American medical community and all his friends. This was prefaced by Ein lachen naht, ich reise weit / Ein letztes Wort, ein Wort der Dankbarkeit [quote from Conrad F. Meyer - translated as A boat approaches, I travel far, A last word, a word of gratitude.]
