= Pendrin =

Anion exchange protein

SLC26A4

Identifiers
- Aliases: SLC26A4, DFNB4, EVA, PDS, TDH2B, solute carrier family 26 member 4
- External IDs: OMIM: 605646; MGI: 1346029; GeneCards: SLC26A4

Gene location (Human)
Chr.	Chromosome 7 (human)
Band	7q22.3	Start	107,660,828 bp
Band	7q22.3	End	107,717,809 bp

Gene location (Mouse)
Chr.	Chromosome 12 (mouse)
Band	12|12 A2	Start	31,569,826 bp
Band	12|12 A2	End	31,609,968 bp
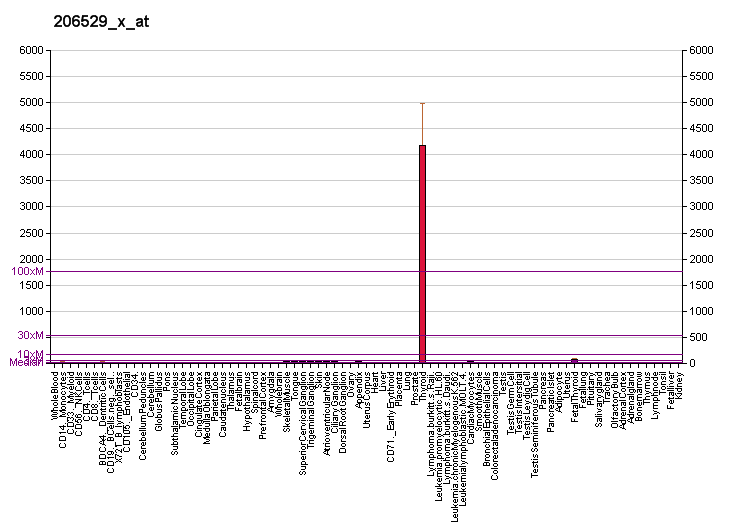
RNA expression pattern
Bgee	Human / Mouse (ortholog); Top expressed in: palpebral conjunctiva; right lobe of thyroid gland; left lobe of thyroid gland; Achilles tendon; Brodmann area 23; kidney tubule; nasal epithelium; glomerulus; testicle; middle temporal gyrus / Top expressed in: ciliary body; vestibular membrane of cochlear duct; iris; utricle; vestibular sensory epithelium; right kidney; human kidney; cochlea; stria vascularis; connecting tubule; More reference expression data
BioGPS	More reference expression data
Gene ontology
Molecular function	chloride transmembrane transporter activity; sulfate transmembrane transporter activity; secondary active sulfate transmembrane transporter activity; bicarbonate transmembrane transporter activity; oxalate transmembrane transporter activity; chloride channel activity; iodide transmembrane transporter activity
Cellular component	integral component of membrane; membrane; plasma membrane; integral component of plasma membrane; brush border membrane; apical plasma membrane; extracellular exosome
Biological process	sulfate transport; regulation of membrane potential; regulation of intracellular pH; chloride transmembrane transport; ion transport; hearing; regulation of protein localization; bicarbonate transport; inorganic anion transport; anion transmembrane transport; iodide transport; regulation of pH; oxalate transport; sulfate transmembrane transport; transmembrane transport; chloride transport; transport
Sources:Amigo / QuickGO
Orthologs
Databases	NCBI: entry; OMA: entry
Species	Human	Mouse
Entrez	5172	23985
Ensembl	ENSG00000091137	ENSMUSG00000020651
UniProt	O43511	Q9R155
RefSeq (mRNA)	NM_000441	NM_011867
RefSeq (protein)	NP_000432	NP_035997
Location (UCSC)	Chr 7: 107.66 – 107.72 Mb	Chr 12: 31.57 – 31.61 Mb
PubMed search
- Wikidata
View/Edit Human	View/Edit Mouse

Pendrin is an anion exchange protein that in humans is encoded by the SLC26A4 gene (solute carrier family 26, member 4). Pendrin was initially identified as a sodium-independent chloride-iodide exchanger with subsequent studies showing that it also accepts formate and bicarbonate as substrates. Pendrin is similar to the Band 3 transport protein found in red blood cells. Pendrin is the protein which is mutated in Pendred syndrome, which is an autosomal recessive disorder characterized by sensorineural hearing loss, goiter and a partial organification problem detectable by a positive perchlorate test.

Pendrin orthologs are responsible for mediating the electroneutral exchange of chloride (Cl^{−}) for bicarbonate (HCO_{3}^{−}) across a plasma membrane in the chloride cells of freshwater fish, and show changes in expression in response to salinity change in the gills of Atlantic stingrays.

By phylogenetic analysis, pendrin has been found to be a close relative of prestin present on the hair cells or organ of corti in the inner ear. Prestin is primarily an electromechanical transducer but pendrin is an ion transporter.

== Function ==
Pendrin is an ion exchanger found in many types of cells in the body. High levels of pendrin expression have been identified in the inner ear and thyroid.

=== Thyroid ===
Thyroid hormone synthesis, with Pendrin seen at center between the follicular colloid and the follicular cell.

In the thyroid, pendrin is expressed by thyroid follicular cells. Na^{+}/I^{−} symporter imports iodide (I^{−}) into the cell across its basolateral side, and pendrin extrudes the I^{−} across the cell's apical membrane into the thyroid colloid.

=== Inner ear ===
The exact function of pendrin in the inner ear remains unclear; however, pendrin may play a role in acid-base balance as a chloride-bicarbonate exchanger, regulate volume homeostasis through its ability to function as a chloride-formate exchanger or indirectly modulate the calcium concentration of the endolymph. Pendrin is also expressed in the kidney, and has been localized to the apical membrane of a population of intercalated cells in the cortical collecting duct where it is involved in bicarbonate secretion.

=== Kidney ===
Renal β-intercalated cells of the late distal tube and collecting duct express pendrin upon their apical membrane, resorbing one Cl^{−} in exchange for secreting a HCO3^{−}, with Cl^{−} subsequently extruded from the cell by a basolateral Cl^{−} channel. β-intercalated cells thus utilise pendrin to contribute to acid-base homeostasis by excreting base (HCO3^{−}) into urine. Additionally, β-intercalated cells may use pendrin in concert with a Na^{+}/HCO3^{−}/2Cl^{−} antiporter in order to resorb NaCl.

== Clinical significance ==
Mutations in this gene are associated with Pendred syndrome, the most common form of syndromic deafness, an autosomal-recessive disease. Pendred syndrome is characterized by thyroid goiter and enlargement of the vestibular aqueduct resulting in deafness; however, despite being expressed in the kidney, individuals with Pendred syndrome do not show any kidney-related acid-base, or volume abnormalities under basal conditions. This is probably the result of other bicarbonate or chloride transporters in the kidney compensating for any loss of pendrin function. Only under extreme situations of salt depletion or metabolic alkalosis, or with inactivation of the sodium-chloride cotransporter, are fluid and electrolyte disorders manifested in these patients. SLC26A4 is highly homologous to the SLC26A3 gene; they have similar genomic structures and this gene is located 3' of the SLC26A3 gene. The encoded protein has homology to sulfate transporters.

Another little-understood role of pendrin is in airway hyperreactivity and inflammation, as during asthma attacks and allergic reactions. Expression of pendrin in the lung increases in response to allergens and high concentrations of IL-13, and overexpression of pendrin results in airway inflammation, hyperreactivity, and increased mucus production. These symptoms could result from pendrin's effects on ion concentration in the airway surface liquid, possibly causing the liquid to be less hydrated.
