= Thyroid diverticulum =

Details
- Precursor: Second pharyngeal arch
- Gives rise to: Thyroid follicular cells

Identifiers
- Latin: saccus thyreoideus; diverticulum thyreoideum
- TE: diverticulum_by_E5.4.1.2.0.0.9 E5.4.1.2.0.0.9

The thyroid pouch or thyroid diverticulum is the embryological structure of the second pharyngeal arch from which thyroid follicular cells derive.

It grows from the floor of the pharynx.

== See also ==
- Diverticulum
