= Thyroxine =

Thyroid hormone

Names
- Other names O-(4-hydroxy-3,5-diiodophenyl)-3,5-diiodo-L-tyrosine, (-)-thyroxine, 3,3′,5,5′-tetraiodo-L-thyronine

Identifiers
CAS Number	51-48-9 l enantiomer; 300-30-1 DL
3D model (JSmol)	Interactive image
ChEBI	CHEBI:30660
ChEMBL	ChEMBL42115
ChemSpider	830
EC Number	206-088-9
PubChem CID	853
UNII	QR0BV3BRIA
CompTox Dashboard (EPA)	DTXSID0023662
- InChI: InChI=1S/C15H11I4NO4/c16-8-4-7(5-9(17)13(8)21)24-14-10(18)1-6(2-11(14)19)3-12(20)15(22)23/h1-2,4-5,12,21H,3,20H2,(H,22,23) Key: XUIIKFGFIJCVMT-UHFFFAOYSA-N
- SMILES: OC(=O)[C@@H](N)Cc1cc(I)c(c(I)c1)Oc2cc(I)c(O)c(I)c2

Properties
Chemical formula	C_{15}H_{11}I_{4}NO_{4}
Molar mass	776.874 g·mol^{−1}
Appearance	white solid
Melting point	235–236 °C (455–457 °F; 508–509 K)
- Except where otherwise noted, data are given for materials in their standard state (at 25 °C [77 °F], 100 kPa). Infobox references

Thyroxine, also known as tetraiodothyronine or T_{4}, is a hormone produced by the thyroid gland. It is the primary form of thyroid hormone found in the blood and acts as a prohormone of the more active thyroid hormone, triiodothyronine (T_{3}). Thyroxine and its active metabolites are essential for regulating metabolic rate, supporting heart and muscle function, promoting brain development, and maintaining bone health.

== Regulation ==
Thyroxine has a half-life of approximately one week and hence maintains relatively stable blood levels. Its production and release are controlled through a complex feedback loop involving the hypothalamus, pituitary gland, and thyroid gland. This regulatory system ensures that optimal hormone levels are maintained.

== Biosynthesis ==
Biosynthesis of thyroxine

Thyroxine biosynthesis is a multi-step process that occurs in follicular cells within the thyroid gland. The synthesis of thyroxine requires adequate iodine supply and appropriate hormonal control.

The process begins with the active uptake of iodide from the bloodstream by thyroid follicular cells through the sodium/iodide symporter (NIS) located in the basolateral membrane. Once inside the cell, iodide is transported to the follicular lumen, where it undergoes oxidation by the enzyme thyroid peroxidase (TPO) in the presence of hydrogen peroxide generated by the NADPH oxidase DUOX2. The oxidized iodine then iodinates tyrosyl residues of thyroglobulin (Tg), a glycoprotein synthesized by thyroid cells and stored in the follicular lumen. This process, known as organification, results in the formation of monoiodotyrosine (MIT) and diiodotyrosine (DIT) residues within the Tg molecule.

The final step in thyroxine synthesis involves the free radical mediated coupling of two DIT residues, catalyzed by TPO, to form T_{4} while still attached to the Tg backbone. When thyroid hormone is needed, Tg is internalized by thyrocytes, and proteolytic enzymes in lysosomes cleave the T_{4} from Tg, allowing for its release into the bloodstream. This intricate biosynthetic pathway is tightly regulated by thyroid-stimulating hormone (TSH) from the pituitary gland, which influences virtually every stage of thyroid hormone production.
