= Thyroid peroxidase =

Enzyme expressed mainly in the thyroid gland

iodide peroxidase
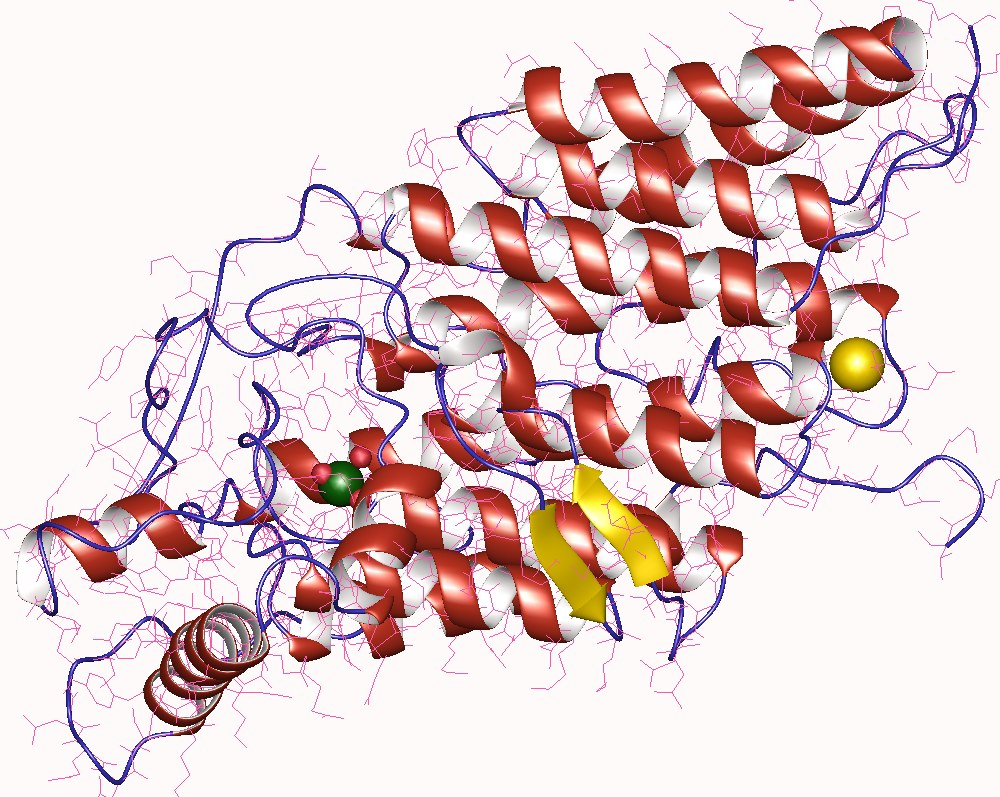
- iodide peroxidase monomer, Zobellia galactanivorans

Identifiers
- EC no.: 1.11.1.8
- CAS no.: 9031-28-1

Databases
- BRENDA: enzyme data
- ExPASy: NiceZyme view
- KEGG: enzyme entry
- MetaCyc: metabolic pathway
- Rhea: reactions
- PDB structures: RCSB PDB PDBe PDBsum
- Gene Ontology: AmiGO / QuickGO
Search
- PMC: articles
- PubMed: articles
- NCBI: proteins

thyroid peroxidase

Identifiers
- Symbol: TPO
- NCBI gene: 7173
- HGNC: 12015
- OMIM: 606765
- RefSeq: NM_175722
- UniProt: P07202

Other data
- EC number: 1.11.1.8
- Locus: Chr. 2 pter-p24
Search for
- Structures: Swiss-model
- Domains: InterPro

Thyroid peroxidase, also called thyroperoxidase (TPO), thyroid specific peroxidase or iodide peroxidase, is an enzyme expressed mainly in the thyroid where it is secreted into colloid. Thyroid peroxidase oxidizes iodide ions to form iodine atoms for addition onto tyrosine residues on thyroglobulin for the production of thyroxine (T_{4}) or triiodothyronine (T_{3}), the thyroid hormones. In humans, thyroperoxidase is encoded by the TPO gene.

== Function ==
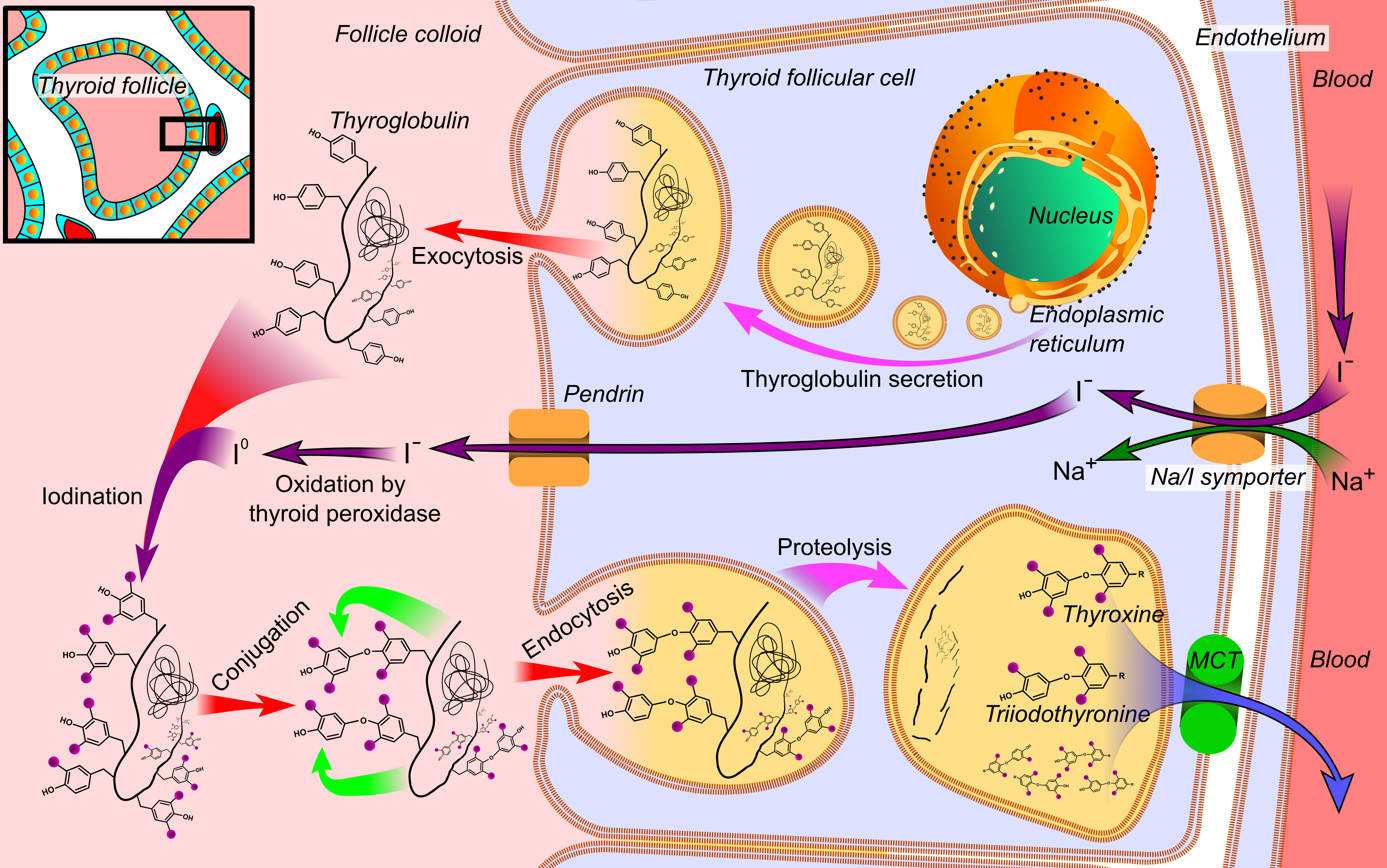
Thyroid hormone synthesis, with thyroid peroxidase performing the oxidation and conjugation steps seen at center-left in the image.

Inorganic iodine enters the body primarily as iodide, I^{−}. After entering the thyroid follicle (or thyroid follicular cell) via a Na^{+}/I^{−} symporter (NIS) on the basolateral side, iodide is shuttled across the apical membrane into the colloid via pendrin after which thyroid peroxidase oxidizes iodide to atomic iodine (I) or iodinium (I^{+}). The chemical reactions catalyzed by thyroid peroxidase occur on the outer apical membrane surface and are mediated by hydrogen peroxide.

The "organification of iodine", the incorporation of iodine into thyroglobulin for the production of thyroid hormone, is nonspecific; that is, there is no TPO-bound intermediate, but iodination occurs via reactive iodine species released from TPO. Ascidians (tunicates or sea squirts) and amphioxus, which are close invertebrate relatives of vertebrates, have a primitive homolog of the thyroid known as the endostyle. They do not have a thyroglobulin gene that produce a protein intended specifically for making thyroxine, but do produce thyroxine. Presumably they simply rely on the nonspecific action.

== Catalyzed reaction ==
A higher-level view of the conjugation process (the first and the second arrows).

The reactions registered with Enzyme Commission no. 1.11.1.8 are:

1. Conversion of iodide to diiodine, 2 I^{−} + H_{2}O_{2} + 2 H^{+} = I_{2} + 2 H_{2}O
2. Generation of 3-iodo-tyrosine, [thyroglobulin]-L-tyrosine + I^{−} + H_{2}O_{2} + H^{+} = [thyroglobulin]-3-iodo-L-tyrosine + 2 H_{2}O
3. Generation of 3,5-iodo-tyrosine, [thyroglobulin]-3-iodo-L-tyrosine + I^{−} + H_{2}O_{2} + H^{+} = [thyroglobulin]-3,5-diiodo-L-tyrosine + 2 H_{2}O
4. Coupling to produce T_{4}, 2 [thyroglobulin]-3,5-diiodo-L-tyrosine + H_{2}O_{2} = [thyroglobulin]-L-thyroxine + [thyroglobulin]-dehydroalanine + 2 H_{2}O
5. Coupling to produce T_{3}, [thyroglobulin]-3-iodo-L-tyrosine + [thyroglobulin]-3,5-diiodo-L-tyrosine + H_{2}O_{2} = [thyroglobulin]-3,3',5-triiodo-L-thyronine + [thyroglobulin]-dehydroalanine + 2 H_{2}O

However, in light of the non-specific organification by TPO, it would be useful to distinguish which actions are the "true" functions of TPO. Under the model of Kessler et al. (2008), the real functions of TPO are:

- Conversion of iodide to diiodine, as in reaction (1) above. The I_{2} produced would go on to react with OH^{−} to form HOI, which reacts with the tyrosyl residue on proteins such as thyroglobulin, explaining the reactions (2) and (3) above.
- Generation of free radicals from tyrosyl, 3-iodotyrosyl (MIT), and 3,5-diiodotyrosyl (DIT) residues or their free forms. These free radicals couple with iodized proteins (such as [thyroglobulin]-3,5-diiodo-L-tyrosine) to perform reactions (4) and (5).

Both actions are mediated by the oxidized form of TPO, TPO-O, produced by reaction of TPO with hydrogen peroxide.

=== Side reactions ===
T_{3} is produced when a MIT free radical couples to a DIT residue on a protein. Coupling of DIT to MIT in the opposite order yields a substance, r-T_{3}, which is biologically inactive. T_{2} and T_{1} are also known to occur naturally.

== Stimulation and inhibition ==
TPO is stimulated by TSH, which upregulates gene expression.

TPO is inhibited by the thioamide drugs, such as propylthiouracil and methimazole. In laboratory rats with insufficient iodine intake, genistein has demonstrated inhibition of TPO.

== Clinical significance ==
Thyroid peroxidase is a frequent epitope of autoantibodies in autoimmune thyroid disease, with such antibodies being called anti-thyroid peroxidase antibodies (anti-TPO antibodies). This is most commonly associated with Hashimoto's thyroiditis. Thus, an antibody titer can be used to assess disease activity in patients that have developed such antibodies.

== Diagnostic use ==
In diagnostic immunohistochemistry, the expression of thyroid peroxidase (TPO) is lost in papillary thyroid carcinoma.

== Biotechnology ==
TPO's ability to non-selectively couple tyrosine residues together has been used to modify protein tags.

== See also ==
Antithyroid antibodies
