= Iodothyronine deiodinase =

Class of enzymes

Type I thyroxine 5'-deiodinase

Identifiers
- EC no.: 1.21.99.4
- CAS no.: 70712-46-8

Databases
- BRENDA: enzyme data
- ExPASy: NiceZyme view
- KEGG: enzyme entry
- MetaCyc: metabolic pathway
- Rhea: reactions
- PDB structures: RCSB PDB PDBe PDBsum
- Gene Ontology: AmiGO / QuickGO
Search
- PMC: articles
- PubMed: articles
- NCBI: proteins

Type II thyroxine 5-deiodinase

Identifiers
- EC no.: 1.21.99.3
- CAS no.: 74506-30-2

Databases
- BRENDA: enzyme data
- ExPASy: NiceZyme view
- KEGG: enzyme entry
- MetaCyc: metabolic pathway
- Rhea: reactions
- PDB structures: RCSB PDB PDBe PDBsum
- Gene Ontology: AmiGO / QuickGO
Search
- PMC: articles
- PubMed: articles
- NCBI: proteins

Type III thyroxine 5-deiodinase
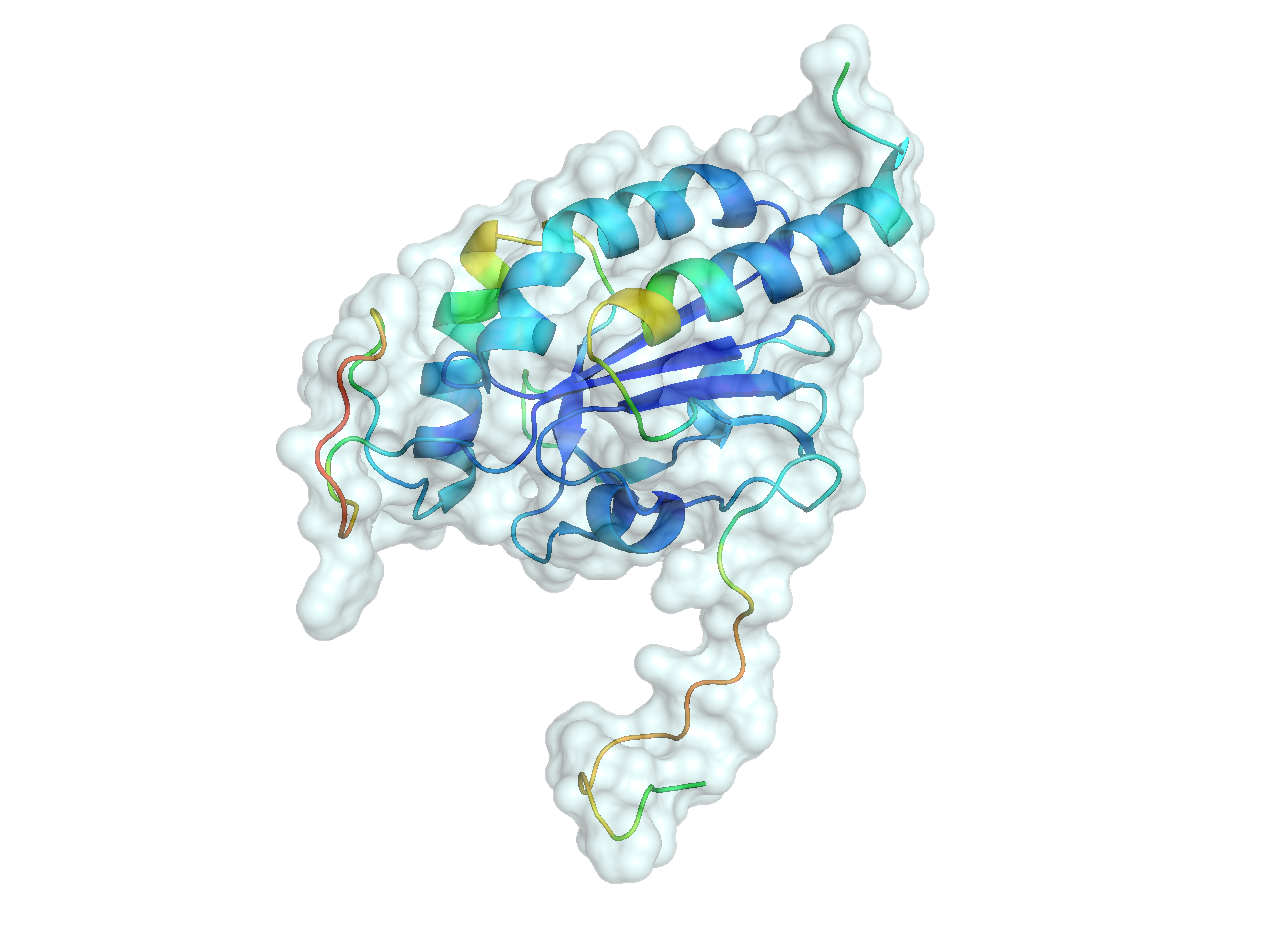
- Mouse iodothyronine deiodinase 3 catalytic core rendered from PDB entry 4TR3

Identifiers
- EC no.: 1.97.1.11
- CAS no.: 74506-30-2

Databases
- BRENDA: enzyme data
- ExPASy: NiceZyme view
- KEGG: enzyme entry
- MetaCyc: metabolic pathway
- Rhea: reactions
- PDB structures: RCSB PDB PDBe PDBsum
- Gene Ontology: AmiGO / QuickGO
Search
- PMC: articles
- PubMed: articles
- NCBI: proteins

Iodothyronine deiodinases (EC 1.21.99.4 and EC 1.21.99.3) are a subfamily of deiodinase enzymes important in the activation and deactivation of thyroid hormones. Thyroxine (T_{4}), the precursor of 3,5,3'-triiodothyronine (T_{3}) is transformed into T_{3} by deiodinase activity. T_{3}, through binding a nuclear thyroid hormone receptor, influences the expression of genes in practically every vertebrate cell. Iodothyronine deiodinases are unusual in that these enzymes contain selenium, in the form of an otherwise rare amino acid selenocysteine.

These enzymes are not to be confused with the iodotyrosine deiodinases that are also deiodinases, but not members of the iodothyronine family. The iodotyrosine deiodinases (unlike the iodothyronine deiodinases) do not use selenocysteine or selenium. The iodotyrosine enzymes work on iodinated single tyrosine residue molecules to scavenge iodine, and do not use as substrates the double-tyrosine residue molecules of the various iodothyronines.

== Activation and inactivation ==
In tissues, deiodinases can either activate or inactivate thyroid hormones:

- Activation occurs by conversion of thyroxine (T_{4}) to the active hormone triiodothyronine (T_{3}) through the removal of an iodine atom on the outer ring.
- Inactivation of thyroid hormones occurs by removal of an iodine atom on the inner ring, which converts thyroxine to the inactive reverse triiodothyronine (rT_{3}), or which converts the active triiodothyronine to diiodothyronine (T_{2}).

The major part of thyroxine deiodination occurs within the cells.

Deiodinase 2 activity can be regulated by ubiquitination:

- The covalent attachment of ubiquitin inactivates D2 by disrupting dimerization and targets it to degradation in the proteosome.
- Deubiquitination removing ubiquitin from D2 restores its activity and prevents proteasomal degradation.
- The Hedgehog cascade acts to increase D2 ubiquitination through WSB1 activity, decreasing D2 activity.

D-propranolol inhibits thyroxine deiodinase, thereby blocking the conversion of T_{4} to T_{3}, providing some though minimal therapeutic effect.

== Reactions ==
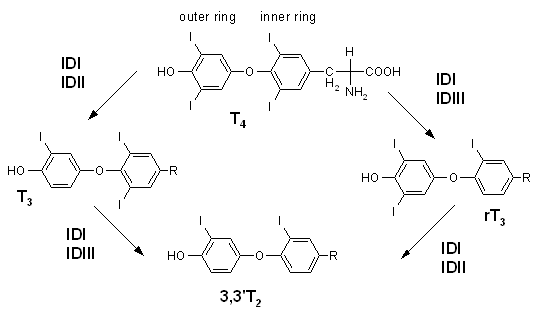
Reactions catalyzed by specific deiodinase isoforms

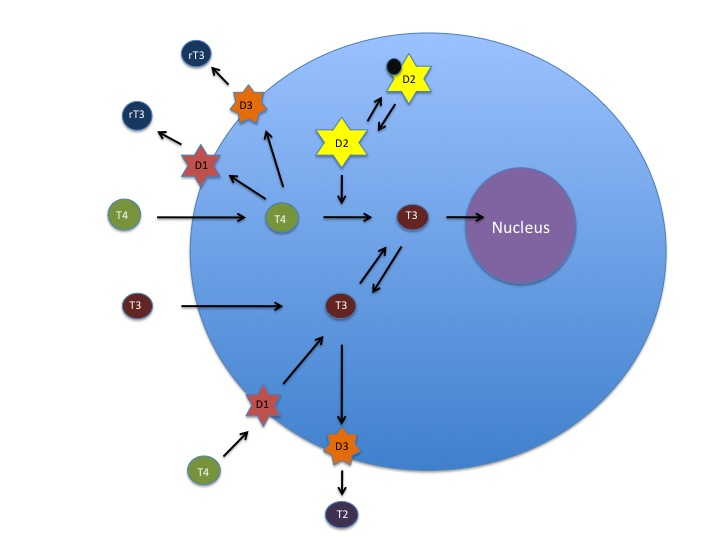
Iodothyronine deiodinase activity and regulation

== Structure ==
The three deiodinase enzymes share certain structural features in common although their sequence identity is lower than 50%. Each enzyme weighs between 29 and 33kDa. Deiodinases are dimeric integral membrane proteins with single transmembrane segments and large globular heads (see below). They share a TRX fold that contains the active site including the rare selenocysteine amino acid and two histidine residues. Selenocysteine is coded by a UGA codon, which generally signifies termination of a peptide through a stop codon. In point mutation experiments with Deiodinase 1 changing UGA to the stop codon TAA resulted in a complete loss of function, while changing UGA to cysteine (TGT) caused the enzyme to operate at around 10% normal efficiency. In order for UGA to be read as a selenocysteine amino acid instead of a stop codon, it is necessary that a downstream stem loop sequence, the selenocysteine insertion sequence (SECIS), be present to bind with SECIS binding protein-2 (SBP-2), which binds with elongation factor EFsec. The translation of selenocysteine is not efficient, even though it is important to the functioning of the enzyme. Deiodinase 2 is localized to the ER membrane while Deiodinase 1 and 3 are found in the plasma membrane.

The related catalytic domains of Deiodinases 1-3 feature a thioredoxine-related peroxiredoxin fold. The enzymes catalyze a reductive elimination of iodine, thereby oxidizing themselves similar to Prx, followed by a reductive recycling of the enzyme.

== Types ==
In most vertebrates, there are three types of enzymes that can deiodinate thyroid hormones:

Type	Location	Function	
type I (DI)	is commonly found in the liver and kidney	DI can deiodinate both rings	Type I iodothyronine deiodinase Identifiers: Symbol: DIO1; Alt. symbols: TXDI1; NCBI gene: 1733; HGNC: 2883; OMIM: 147892; RefSeq: NM_000792; UniProt: P49895; Other data: EC number: 1.21.99.3; Locus: Chr. 1 p32-p33 Search for; Structures: Swiss-model; Domains: InterPro
type II deiodinase (DII)	is found in the heart, skeletal muscle, CNS, fat, thyroid, and pituitary	DII can only deiodinate the outer ring of the prohormone thyroxine and is the major activating enzyme (the already inactive reverse triiodothyronine is also degraded further by DII)	Type II iodothyronine deiodinase Identifiers: Symbol: DIO2; Alt. symbols: TXDI2, SelY; NCBI gene: 1734; HGNC: 2884; OMIM: 601413; RefSeq: NM_000793; UniProt: Q92813; Other data: EC number: 1.21.99.4; Locus: Chr. 14 q24.2-24.3 Search for; Structures: Swiss-model; Domains: InterPro
type III deiodinase (DIII)	found in the fetal tissue and the placenta; also present throughout the brain, except in the pituitary	DIII can only deiodinate the inner ring of thyroxine or triiodothyronine and is the major inactivating enzyme	Type III iodothyronine deiodinase Identifiers: Symbol: DIO3; Alt. symbols: TXDI3; NCBI gene: 1735; HGNC: 2885; OMIM: 601038; PDB: 4TR3; RefSeq: NM_001362; UniProt: P55073; Other data: EC number: 1.97.1.11; Locus: Chr. 14 q32 Search for; Structures: Swiss-model; Domains: InterPro

Related proteins have been found in invertebrate chordates, mostly with a selenocystine, though a few have cystine instead.

== Function ==
Deiodinase 1 both activates T_{4} to produce T_{3} and inactivates T_{4}. Besides its increased function in producing extrathyroid T_{3} in patients with hyperthyroidism, its function is less well understood than D2 or D3 Deiodinase 2, located in the ER membrane, converts T_{4} into T_{3} and is a major source of the cytoplasmic T_{3} pool. Deiodinase 3 prevents T_{4} activation and inactivates T_{3}. D2 and D3 are important in homeostatic regulation in maintaining T_{3} levels at the plasma and cellular levels. In hyperthyroidism D2 is down regulated and D3 is upregulated to clear extra T_{3}, while in hypothyroidism D2 is upregulated and D3 is downregulated to increase cytoplasmic T_{3} levels.

Serum T_{3} levels remain fairly constant in healthy individuals, but D2 and D3 can regulate tissue specific intracellular levels of T_{3} to maintain homeostasis since T_{3} and T_{4} levels may vary by organ. Deiodinases also provide spatial and temporal developmental control of thyroid hormone levels. D3 levels are highest early in development and decrease over time, while D2 levels are high at moments of significant metamorphic change in tissues. Thus D2 enables production of sufficient T_{3} at necessary time points while D3 may shield tissue from overexposure to T_{3}.

Also, iodothyronine deiodinases (type 2 y 3; DIO2 and DIO3, respectively) respond to seasonal changes in photoperiod-driven melatonin secretion and govern peri-hypothalamic catabolism of the prohormone thyroxine (T4). In long summer days, the production of hypothalamic T3 increase due to DIO-2-mediated conversion of T4 to the biologically active hormone. This process allows to active anabolic neuroendocrine pathways that maintain reproductive competence and increase body weight. However, during the adaptation to reproductively inhibitory photoperiods, the levels of T3 decrease due to peri-hypothalamic DIO3 expression that catabolizes T4 and T3 into receptor inactive amines.

Deiodinase 2 also plays a significant role in thermogenesis in brown adipose tissue (BAT). In response to sympathetic stimulation, dropping temperature, or overfeeding BAT, D2 increases oxidation of fatty acids and uncouples oxidative phosphorylation via uncoupling protein, causing mitochondrial heat production. D2 increases during cold stress in BAT and increases intracellular T_{3} levels. In D2 deficient models, shivering is a behavioral adaptation to the cold. However, heat production is much less efficient than uncoupling lipid oxidation.

== Disease relevance ==
In cardiomyopathy the heart reverts to a fetal gene programming due to the overload of the heart. Like during fetal development, thyroid hormone levels are low in the overloaded heart tissue in a local hypothyroid state, with low levels of deiodinase 1 and deiodinase 2. Although deiodinase 3 levels in a normal heart are generally low, in cardiomyopathy deiodinase 3 activity is increased to decrease energy turnover and oxygen consumption.

Hypothyroidism is a disease diagnosed by decreased levels of serum thyroxine (T_{4}). Presentation in adults leads to decreased metabolism, increased weight gain, and neuropsychiatric complications. During development, hypothyroidism is considered more severe and leads to neurotoxicity as cretinism or other human cognitive disorders, altered metabolism and underdeveloped organs. Medication and environmental exposures can result in hypothyroidism with changes in deiodinase enzyme activity. The drug iopanoic acid (IOP) decreased cutaneous cell proliferation by inhibition of deiodinase enzyme type 1 or 2 reducing the conversion of T_{4} to T_{3}. The environmental chemical DE-71, a PBDE pentaBDE brominated flame retardant decreased hepatic deiodinase I transcription and enzyme activity in neonatal rats with hypothyroidism.

== Quantifying enzyme activity ==
In vitro, including cell culture experiments, deiodination activity is determined by incubating cells or homogenates with high amounts of labeled thyroxine (T_{4}) and required cosubstrates. As a measure of deiodination, the production of radioactive iodine and other physiological metabolites, in particular T_{3} or reverse T_{3}, are determined and expressed (e.g. as fmol/mg protein/minute).

In vivo, deiodination activity is estimated from equilibrium levels of free T_{3} and free T_{4}. A simple approximation is T_{3}/T_{4} ratio, a more elaborate approach is calculating sum activity of peripheral deiodinases (SPINA-GD) from free T_{4}, free T_{3} and parameters for protein binding, dissociation and hormone kinetics. In atypical cases, this last approach can benefit from measurements of TBG, but usually only requires measurement of TSH, fT3 and fT4, and as such has no added laboratory requirements besides the measurement of the same.

== See also ==
- Iodotyrosine deiodinase
- Selenium, section Evolution in biology
