= DIO1 =

Protein-coding gene found in humans

Identifiers
- Aliases: DIO1, 5DI, TXDI1, D1, ITDI1, deiodinase, iodothyronine type I, iodothyronine deiodinase 1, THMA2
- External IDs: OMIM: 147892; MGI: 94896; GeneCards: DIO1
Enzyme activity
EC #	BRENDA	ExPASy	KEGG	MetaCyc
1.21.99.3	↗	↗	↗	↗
1.21.99.4	↗	↗	↗	↗

Gene location (Human)
Chr.	Chromosome 1 (human)
Band	1p32.3	Start	53,891,239 bp
Band	1p32.3	End	53,911,086 bp

Gene location (Mouse)
Chr.	Chromosome 4 (mouse)
Band	4 C7|4 50.18 cM	Start	107,148,662 bp
Band	4 C7|4 50.18 cM	End	107,164,366 bp
RNA expression pattern
Bgee	Human / Mouse (ortholog); Top expressed in: right lobe of thyroid gland; kidney tubule; liver; left lobe of thyroid gland; right lobe of liver; glomerulus; metanephric glomerulus; human kidney; testicle; bronchial epithelial cell / Top expressed in: left lobe of liver; islet of Langerhans; jejunum; crypt of lieberkuhn of small intestine; left colon; ileum; right kidney; duodenum; epithelium of stomach; human kidney; More reference expression data
BioGPS	n/a
Gene ontology
Molecular function	selenium binding; oxidoreductase activity; thyroxine 5'-deiodinase activity
Cellular component	endoplasmic reticulum membrane; plasma membrane; membrane; integral component of membrane; endoplasmic reticulum
Biological process	thyroid hormone generation; hormone biosynthetic process; thyroid hormone metabolic process
Sources:Amigo / QuickGO
Orthologs
Databases	NCBI: entry; OMA: entry
Species	Human	Mouse
Entrez	1733	13370
Ensembl	ENSG00000211452	ENSMUSG00000034785
UniProt	P49895	Q61153
RefSeq (mRNA)	NM_000792; NM_001039715; NM_001039716; NM_213593; NM_001324316	NM_007860
RefSeq (protein)	NP_000783; NP_001034804; NP_001034805; NP_001311245; NP_998758	NP_031886
Location (UCSC)	Chr 1: 53.89 – 53.91 Mb	Chr 4: 107.15 – 107.16 Mb
PubMed search
- Wikidata
View/Edit Human	View/Edit Mouse

Type I iodothyronine deiodinase is an enzyme that in humans is encoded by the DIO1 gene. This enzyme is a type of iodothyronine deiodinase (EC 1.21.99.3/EC 1.21.99.4), which are enzymes involved in activating and deactivate thyroid hormones by removing iodine atoms from them (called deiodination). This form is distinct in being capable of both activation and inactivation, unlike type II iodothyronine deiodinase which can only activate (EC 1.21.99.4) thyroid hormones, and type III iodothyronine deiodinase which can only deactivate (EC 1.21.99.3) thyroid hormones.

== Function ==
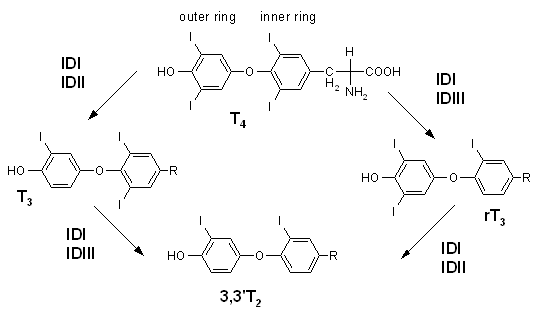
Activation and deactivation of thyroid hormones by the 3 types of iodothyronine deiodinase

As an (outer ring) thyroxine 5-deiodinase, (EC 1.21.99.4) the DIO1 enzyme is able to catalyze the following reaction:

L-thyroxine + AH_{2} → 3,3',5-triiodo-L-thyronine + iodide + A + H^{+}

Which converts the less active thyroxine (T_{4}) into the more active triiodothyronine (T_{3}) hormone. It is also able to act as an (inner ring) thyroxine 5'-deiodinase, (EC 1.21.99.3), which means it is also able to catalyze:

L-thyroxine + AH_{2} → 3,3',5'-triiodo-L-thyronine + iodide + A + H^{+}

Which instead produces reverse triiodothyronine (rT_{3}).

== Medical significance ==
Certain variants in the DIO1 gene have been associated with unusually high levels of rT_{3} in blood tests, called Thyroid hormone metabolism, abnormal, 2 (THMA2). However, the effect of this on health, if any, remains unclear.
