= Deiodinase =

Enzyme family

thyroxine 5'-deiodinase

Identifiers
- EC no.: 1.97.1.10
- CAS no.: 70712-46-8

Databases
- IntEnz: IntEnz view
- BRENDA: BRENDA entry
- ExPASy: NiceZyme view
- KEGG: KEGG entry
- MetaCyc: metabolic pathway
- PRIAM: profile
- PDB structures: RCSB PDB PDBe PDBsum
- Gene Ontology: AmiGO / QuickGO
Search
- PMC: articles
- PubMed: articles
- NCBI: proteins

Deiodinase (monodeiodinase) is a peroxidase enzyme that is involved in the activation or deactivation of thyroid hormones.

== Types ==
Types of deiodinases include:

family	prosthetic group	genes
Iodothyronine deiodinase		DIO1, DIO2, DIO3
Iodotyrosine deiodinase	Flavin mononucleotide (FMN)	IYD

Iodothyronine deiodinases catalyze release of iodine directly from the thyronine hormones. They are selenocysteine-dependent membrane proteins with a catalytic domain resembling peroxiredoxins (Prx). Three related isoforms, deiodinase type I, II, and III, contribute to activation and inactivation of the initially released hormone precursor T_{4} (thyroxine) into T_{3} (triiodothyronine) or rT_{3} (reverse triiodothyronine) in target cells. The enzymes catalyze a reductive elimination of iodine (the different isoforms attack different thyronine positions), thereby oxidizing themselves similar to Prx, followed by a reductive recycling of the enzyme.

Iodotyrosine deiodinase contributes to breakdown of thyroid hormones. It releases iodine, for renewed use, from iodinated tyrosines resulting from catabolism of iodothyronines. Iodotyrosine deiodinase employs a flavin mononucleotide cofactor and belongs to the NADH oxidase/flavin reductase superfamily.

== Starvation response ==
In starvation or severe somatic stress, deiodinase type 1 is inhibited which lowers circulating levels of T_{3} (due to it being the main source of peripherally converted T_{3} from T_{4} in the plasma), causing a decrease in the metabolic rate. Intuitively, if plasma levels of T_{3} fall, there would be a compensatory rise in TSH, the secretion of which is inhibited by T_{3}. However, because type 2 deiodinase mediates the conversion of T_{4} to T_{3} within the pituitary and CNS, and because caloric restriction does not affect this enzyme, local T_{3} levels in the pituitary are normal. Thus, the thyrotrophs (endocrine cells in pituitary) in the pituitary continue to have adequate amounts of T_{3}, and no compensatory rise in TSH occurs. This effect of caloric restriction makes sense for someone who is starving because it tends to conserve body stores of fuel. On the other hand, this effect makes it more difficult to lose weight intentionally while dieting.

== Selenium ==
Selenium in iodothyronine deiodinase, as selenocysteine, plays a crucial role in determining the free circulating levels of T_{3}. Selenium deficiency can have implications in fall of T_{3} levels.
