= Iodotyrosine deiodinase =

Protein-coding gene in the species Homo sapiens

Identifiers
- EC no.: 1.21.1.1

Databases
- BRENDA: enzyme data
- ExPASy: NiceZyme view
- KEGG: enzyme entry
- MetaCyc: metabolic pathway
- Rhea: reactions
- PDB structures: RCSB PDB PDBe PDBsum
Search
- PMC: articles
- PubMed: articles
- NCBI: proteins

IYD

Identifiers
- Aliases: IYD, iodotyrosine deiodinase, C6orf71, DEHAL1, TDH4, dJ422F24.1, IYD-1
- External IDs: OMIM: 612025; MGI: 1917587; GeneCards: IYD
Available structures
PDB	Ortholog search: PDBe RCSB
PDB	List of PDB id codes 4TTB, 4TTC
Enzyme activity
EC #	BRENDA	ExPASy	KEGG	MetaCyc
1.21.1.1	↗	↗	↗	↗

Gene location (Human)
Chr.	Chromosome 6 (human)
Band	6q25.1	Start	150,368,892 bp
Band	6q25.1	End	150,405,969 bp

Gene location (Mouse)
Chr.	Chromosome 10 (mouse)
Band	10|10 A1	Start	3,490,240 bp
Band	10|10 A1	End	3,504,877 bp
RNA expression pattern
Bgee	Human / Mouse (ortholog); Top expressed in: right lobe of thyroid gland; left lobe of thyroid gland; jejunal mucosa; gallbladder; duodenum; rectum; liver; right lobe of liver; human kidney; mucosa of transverse colon / Top expressed in: left lobe of liver; right kidney; epithelium of stomach; proximal tubule; human kidney; duodenum; mucous cell of stomach; thyroid gland; pyloric antrum; trachea; More reference expression data
BioGPS	n/a
Gene ontology
Molecular function	iodide peroxidase activity; protein binding; FMN binding; oxidoreductase activity
Cellular component	membrane; integral component of membrane; nucleoplasm; plasma membrane; integral component of plasma membrane; cytoplasmic vesicle membrane; cytoplasmic vesicle
Biological process	thyroid hormone generation; cellular oxidant detoxification; tyrosine metabolic process; thyroid hormone metabolic process
Sources:Amigo / QuickGO
Orthologs
Databases	NCBI: entry; OMA: entry
Species	Human	Mouse
Entrez	389434	70337
Ensembl	ENSG00000009765	ENSMUSG00000019762
UniProt	Q6PHW0	Q9DCX8
RefSeq (mRNA)	NM_001164694; NM_001164695; NM_203395; NM_001318495	NM_027391
RefSeq (protein)	NP_001158166; NP_001158167; NP_001305424; NP_981932	NP_081667
Location (UCSC)	Chr 6: 150.37 – 150.41 Mb	Chr 10: 3.49 – 3.5 Mb
PubMed search
- Wikidata
View/Edit Human	View/Edit Mouse

Iodotyrosine deiodinase, also known as iodotyrosine dehalogenase 1, is a type of deiodinase enzyme that scavenges iodide by removing it from iodinated tyrosine residues in the thyroid gland. These iodinated tyrosines are produced during thyroid hormone biosynthesis. The iodide that is scavenged by iodotyrosine deiodinase is necessary to again synthesize the thyroid hormones. After synthesis, the thyroid hormones circulate through the body to regulate metabolic rate, protein expression, and body temperature. Iodotyrosine deiodinase is thus necessary to keep levels of both iodide and thyroid hormones in balance.

Dehalogenation in aerobic organisms is usually done through oxidation and hydrolysis; however, iodotyrosine deiodinase uses reductive dehalogenation. Iodotyrosine deiodinase and iodothyronine deiodinase have been determined as the only two known enzymes to catalyze reductive dehalogenation in mammals. Although these two enzymes perform similar functions, they are structurally and mechanistically different. Iodothyronine deiodinase (not the enzyme that is the topic of this article) uses a selenocysteine active site for catalysis, is a member of the thioredoxin superfamily, and removes iodide only when the substrate is in a double-tyrosine form. By contrast, iodotyrosine deiodinase (the topic enzyme) does not require selenocysteine or cysteine for catalysis, is part of the NADH oxidase/flavin reductase superfamily, and removes iodide when the substrate is a single amino acid. Research on iodotyrosine deiodinase has historically been variable and slow due to its lack of stability and arduous purification. Only recently has this enzyme been studied more deeply.

== Structure ==
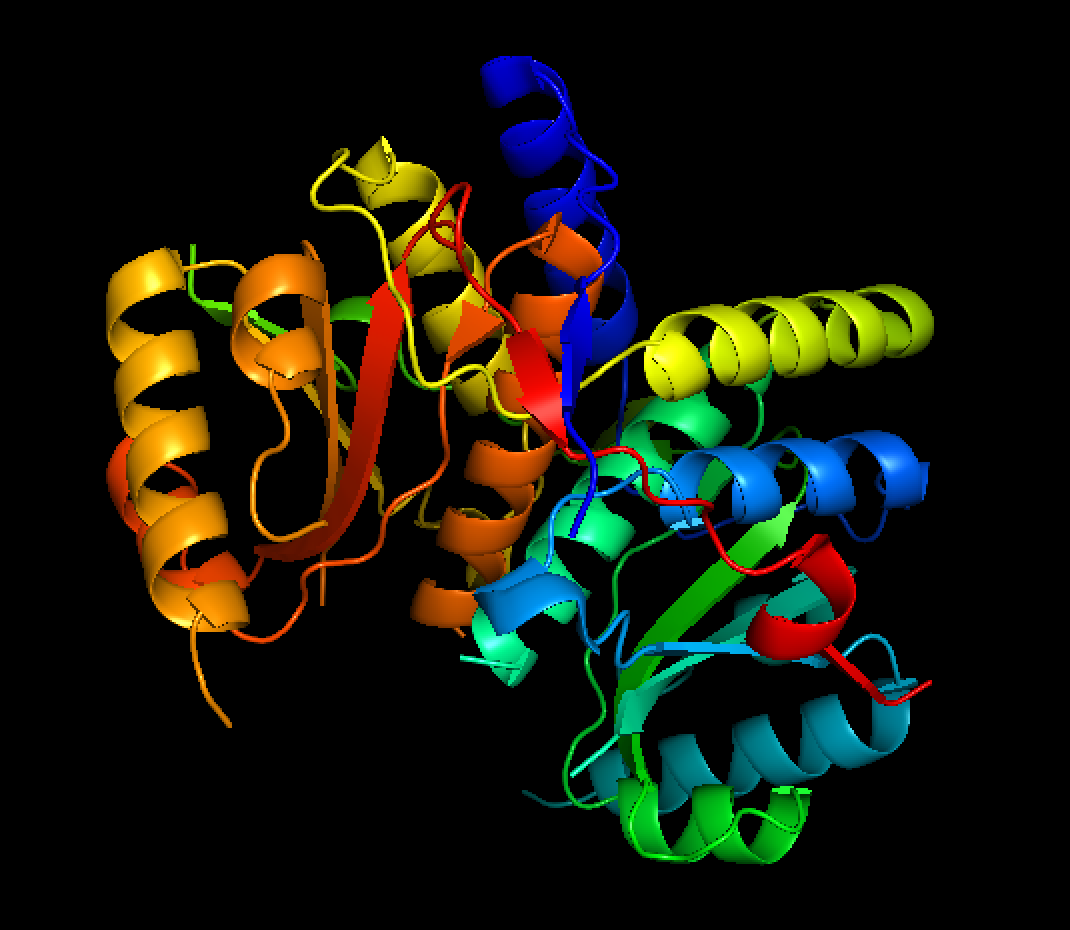
Structure of human iodotyrosine deiodinase generated from PDB entry 4TTB.

The gene encoding this enzyme has been recently identified. The sequence of amino acids of iodotyrosine deiodinase is highly conserved among mammals and contains three domains. Iodotyrosine deiodinase is a membrane protein, with the N-terminus functioning as a membrane anchor. It forms a dimer that is domain-swapped. Initially, iodotyrosine deiodinase was thought to contain only one flavin mononucleotide (FMN) in each dimer, but now iodotyrosine deiodinase is believed to have two FMN molecules for each homodimer. The enzyme has a characteristic α-β fold that all proteins from the NADH oxidase/flavin reductase superfamily have as well. Within the dimer interface, there are two equivalent active sites, each made from residues from both subunits. Thus, subunit association must be required for FMN binding and catalysis. Substrate binding causes a conformational change in the enzyme in order to close the active site, protecting the substrate and flavin from the solvent.

== Function ==
Iodotyrosine deiodinase facilitates iodide salvage in the thyroid by catalyzing deiodination of mono- and diiodotyrosine, the halogenated byproducts of thyroid hormone production. Iodide is also an important micronutrient in the biosynthesis of thyroid hormone, creating a cycle of iodide use in the thyroid. Iodide homeostasis within the thyroid gland is essential for producing thyroid hormone at appropriate rates. Thus, iodide levels must be regulated in order to keep thyroid hormones, and ultimately the organism's metabolic rate and overall health, in good status.

Within the thyroid follicular cell, thyroglobulin is hydrolyzed to form thyroid hormones and mono- and diiodotyrosine. The thyroid hormones are released into the bloodstream and the iodinated tyrosines are recycled. However, the breakdown of thyroglobulin produces 6-7 fold more iodinated tyrosines than thyroid hormone. Iodotyrosine deiodinase salvages the iodide from the deiodination of the iodinated tyrosines. Iodotyrosine deiodinase is located on the apical plasma membrane of the thyroid colloid, where mono- and diiodotyrosine are produced from this breakdown of thyroglobulin. Without iodotyrosine deiodinase activity, the iodide would be excreted with the amino acid tyrosine and thyroid hormone biosynthesis would be reduced.

The enzymatic activity of iodotyrosine deiodinase has also been known to exist in the tissues of the liver and kidneys as well; however, the physiological significance of these findings is not yet clear.

== Mechanism ==
Iodotyrosine deiodinase catalyzes mono- and diiodotyrosine deiodination. The reaction is NADPH-dependent. Flavin mononucleotide (FMN) is a cofactor. Although flavin is commonly utilized in various catalytic reactions, its use in this reductive dehalogenation is unique and not yet fully understood. It is also still unclear if the enzyme mechanism utilizes a two electron transfer reaction or a series of one electron transfers. Although further research must be done to determine details of this mechanism, recent evidence seems to suggest that iodotyrosine deiodinase acts through one electron transfer reactions.

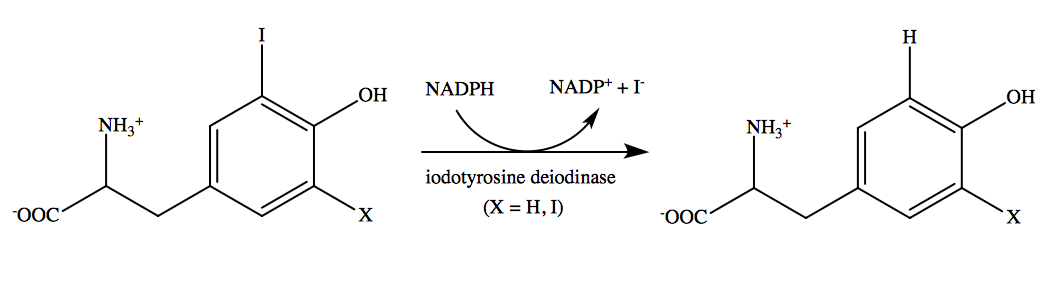
Iodotyrosine deiodinase reaction scheme.

== Clinical significance ==
Mutations in the gene encoding iodotyrosine deiodinase can affect enzyme function and be detrimental to human health. Iodide is an essential micronutrient for health in mammals. Low levels of iodide either through the diet or through iodide metabolism are associated with hypothyroidism, intellectual disability, goiter, and developmental defects. Because iodotyrosine deiodinase is responsible for scavenging iodide, mutations in this enzyme result in iodide deficiency.

The resulting high blood and urine concentrations of iodotyrosine can be used as a measure for diagnosis, as the iodide is not removed from the tyrosine residues effectively. In some countries, newborn babies are tested for congenital hypothyroidism and treated immediately if the disease is detected, safely preventing the development of intellectual disability. However, mutations of iodotyrosine deiodinase are often not detected until after developmental damage has already occurred. Furthermore, these mutations may not be specifically detected using standard thyroid function tests. To combat this issue, a sensitive assay has recently been created that measures the amounts of mono- and diiodotyrosine in the urine.

== See also ==
- Thyroid peroxidase
- Iodotyrosine
- Iodothyronine deiodinase
