= C15H12I3NO4 =

The molecular formula C_{15}H_{12}I_{3}NO_{4} (molar mass: 650.973 g/mol) may refer to:

- Reverse triiodothyronine
- Triiodothyronine
