= Thyroxine deiodinase =

Thyroxine deiodinase may refer to:

- Iodothyronine deiodinase
- Thyroxine 5-deiodinase
