= Thyroid-hormone transaminase =

Identifiers
- EC no.: 2.6.1.26
- CAS no.: 51004-29-6

Databases
- IntEnz: IntEnz view
- BRENDA: BRENDA entry
- ExPASy: NiceZyme view
- KEGG: KEGG entry
- MetaCyc: metabolic pathway
- PRIAM: profile
- PDB structures: RCSB PDB PDBe PDBsum
Search
- PMC: articles
- PubMed: articles
- NCBI: proteins

Thyroid-hormone transaminase (EC 2.6.1.26) is an enzyme that catalyzes the chemical reaction

triiodothyronine
+
α-ketoglutaric acid
3,5,3'-triiodothyropyruvic acid
+
L-glutamic acid

The two substrates of this enzyme characterised from rabbit kidney and liver are the thyroid hormone, triiodothyronine, and α-ketoglutaric acid. Its products are 3,5,3'-triiodothyropyruvic acid and L-glutamic acid.

This enzyme is a transferase, specifically a transaminase, which transfer nitrogenous groups. The systematic name of this enzyme class is L-3,5,3'-triiodothyronine:2-oxoglutarate aminotransferase. Other names in common use include 3,5-dinitrotyrosine transaminase, and thyroid hormone aminotransferase. It uses pyridoxal phosphate as a cofactor.
