= C15H13I2NO4 =

The molecular formula C_{15}H_{13}I_{2}NO_{4} (molar mass: 525.08 g/mol) may refer to:

- 3,3'-Diiodothyronine (3,3-T_{2})
- 3,5-Diiodothyronine (3,5-T_{2})
