= Jack Gross (endocrinologist) =

Canadian-Israeli endocrinologist (1921-1994)

Jack Gross (Hebrew: ג'ק גרוס; 1921-1994) was a Canadian-Israeli endocrinologist and one of the co-discoverers of Triiodothyronine (T3).

== Biography ==
Gross was born in Montreal, into a middle-class Jewish family and earned his M.D. and Phd from McGill University in 1949. His postdoctoral research was at the laboratory of Rosalind Pitt-Rivers at the British National Institute for Medical Research where they co-discovered the active form of thyroid hormone, Triiodothyronine (T3).

In 1952, Gross began teaching at the SUNY Downstate Medical School, where he became a full professor in 1956. In 1957 Gross moved to Jerusalem, Israel, to head the department of Experimental Medicine and Cancer Research in the newly established Hebrew University-Hadassah Medical School.

Between 1963 and 1967, Gross served as the chairman of the Authority for Research and Development of the Hebrew University and as dean of the Faculty of Medicine during the years 1974-1977. Together with Amirav Gordon, in 1968, Gross set up a joint venture with an American company called Ames, to produce radioimmunoassay based diagnostic kits for the thyroid axis, distributed globally.

In 1971, Gross was nominated as the first science adviser to the Israeli Ministry of Commerce and Industry, where he instituted a grants program to support industrial research. Additional roles held by Gross included president of the European Thyroid Association, president of the Israel Endocrine Society and chairman of the research committee of the Israel Cancer Association.

Gross's son, David Gross, is an endocrinologist at Hadassah medical center in the field of neuroendocrine tumors.
