= Liotrix =

Chemical compound

Combination of
- Thyroxine: Thyroid hormone
- Triiodothyronine: Thyroid hormone

Clinical data
- Trade names: Thyrolar
- AHFS/Drugs.com: Multum Consumer Information
- Routes of administration: Oral
- ATC code: H03AA03 (WHO)

Legal status
- Legal status: US: ℞-only

Identifiers
- CAS Number: 8065-29-0
- PubChem CID: 165686
- DrugBank: DB01583
- ChemSpider: none
- UNII: YW8HJ0N26X
- KEGG: D00361
- CompTox Dashboard (EPA): DTXSID401001390

Liotrix is a 4:1 mixture of thyroxine (T_{4}) and triiodothyronine (T_{3}) made synthetically. It is used to replenish thyroid hormones in thyroid deficiency and hypothyroidism. The only brand of liotrix available in the U.S. is Thyrolar, manufactured by Forest Laboratories.

Sometime prior to 2008 Forest Laboratories released the following statement regarding the limited availability of liotrix: "U.S. Pharmacopeia, an official public standards-setting authority for prescription and over-the-counter medicines and other health care products manufactured or sold in the United States, has mandated new specifications for a component used in the manufacturing of Thyrolar. As a result, all strengths of Thyrolar are currently on long-term back order while modifications necessary to meet these new specifications are made."

== Indications ==
The most common usage is hypothyroidism treatment, via supplementation. Other uses include:

- Hashimoto's thyroiditis
- Congenital hypothyroidism
- Goiter treatment with thyroid stimulating hormone suppression
- management of thyroid cancer
- as an agent in a differential diagnosis of hyperthyroidism and thyroid gland autonomy

== Adverse effects ==
Adverse effects are mainly due to chronic accidental overdose. Symptoms mimic those of hyperthyroidism and include headache, chest pain, irregular heartbeat, dyspnea, trembling, sweating, diarrhea, and weight loss. These effects can be reduced through titration of the dose levels, but this should be done by the prescribing physician. Sympathomimetic cardiovascular effects including: heart palpitations, chest pain, arrhythmia, sweating, chest pain, and anxiety, require urgent medical attention. Particularly if these signs occur in patients who are at an increased risk for cardiovascular complications i.e. familial or patient history of myocardial infarction, cardiovascular disease, stroke, arteriosclerosis. Hair loss occasionally occurs in the first few months of treatment, but is reversible. The condition is usually self-limiting without altering treatment.

== Contraindications ==
Thyroid agents should not be used to treat obesity, particularly in euthyroid patients. Regular doses in hypothyroid patients are acceptable, but only in the context of treating hypothyroidism. Excessive doses (and regular doses in euthyroid patients) can result in life-threatening cardiovascular events. Patients should be advised against taking sympathomimetic agents, including stimulants and diet pills, while undergoing hypothyroid treatment, as these agents increase the risk of cardiovascular events.
