= 3'-Monoiodothyronine =

3′-Monoiodothyronine
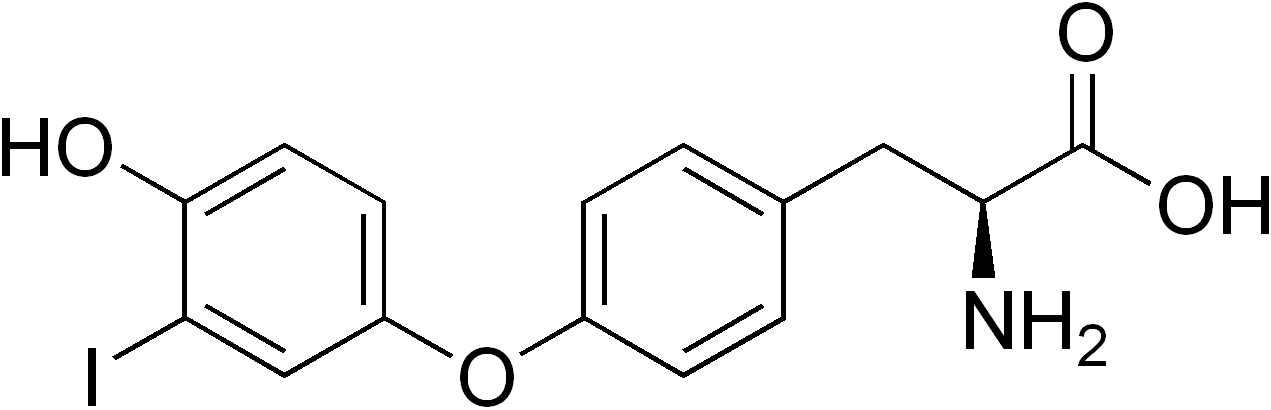

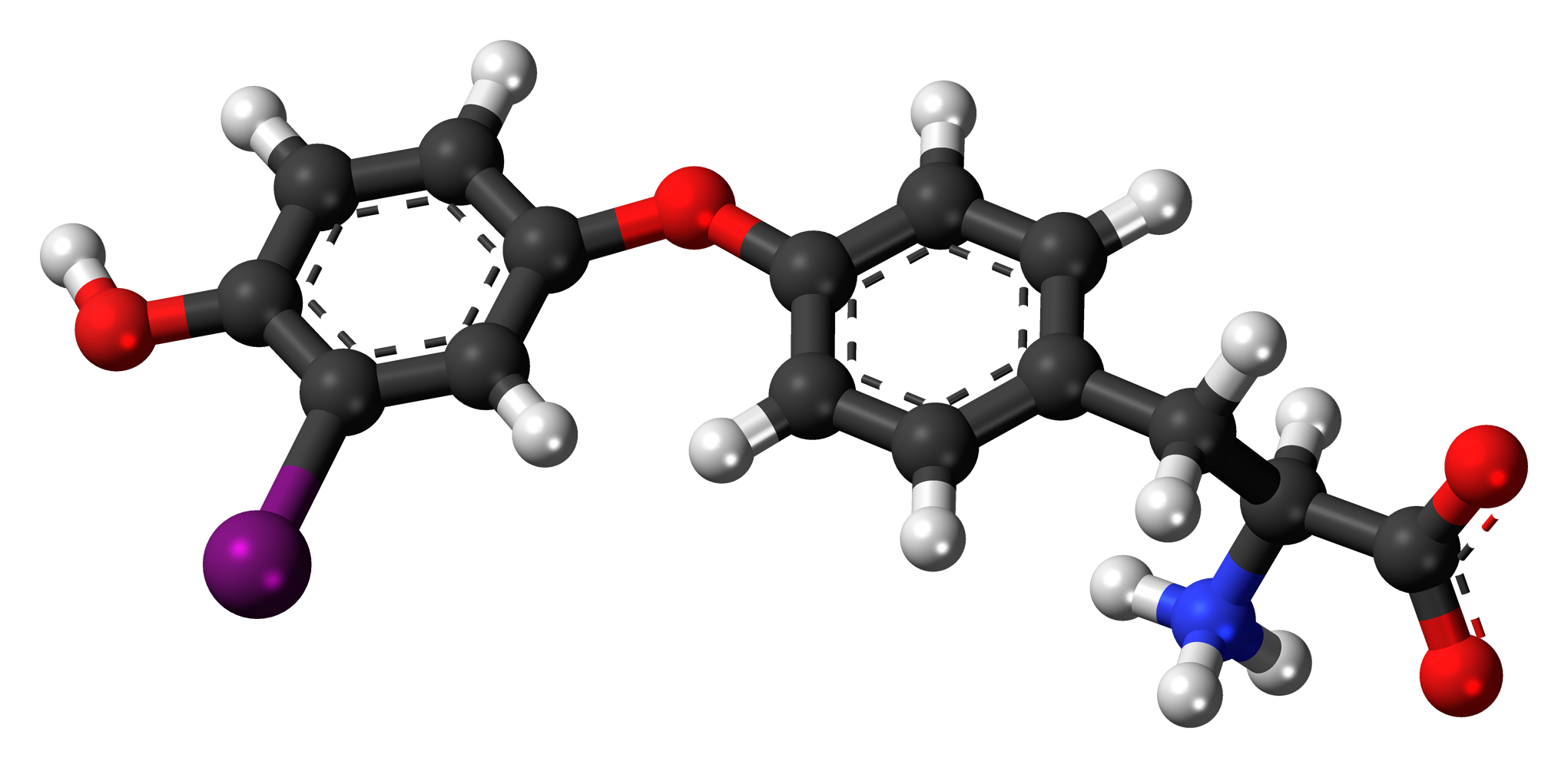

Names
- IUPAC name 3′-Iodo-L-thyronine
- Systematic IUPAC name (2S)-2-Amino-3-[4-(4-hydroxy-3-iodophenoxy)phenyl]propanoic acid
- Other names 3′-T1; O-(4-Hydroxy-3-iodophenyl)-L-tyrosine

Identifiers
CAS Number	4732-82-5
3D model (JSmol)	Interactive image; Interactive image
ChemSpider	108867
PubChem CID	122056
UNII	NM2RL113ZR
CompTox Dashboard (EPA)	DTXSID40197105
- InChI: InChI=1S/C15H14INO4/c16-12-8-11(5-6-14(12)18)21-10-3-1-9(2-4-10)7-13(17)15(19)20/h1-6,8,13,18H,7,17H2,(H,19,20)/t13-/m0/s1 Key: RUIUIJSMLKJUDC-ZDUSSCGKSA-N; InChI=1/C15H14INO4/c16-12-8-11(5-6-14(12)18)21-10-3-1-9(2-4-10)7-13(17)15(19)20/h1-6,8,13,18H,7,17H2,(H,19,20)/t13-/m0/s1 Key: RUIUIJSMLKJUDC-ZDUSSCGKBB
- SMILES: C1=CC(=CC=C1C[C@@H](C(=O)O)N)OC2=CC(=C(C=C2)O)I; Ic2cc(Oc1ccc(cc1)C[C@@H](C(=O)O)N)ccc2O

Properties
Chemical formula	C_{15}H_{14}INO_{4}
Molar mass	399.18 g/mol
- Except where otherwise noted, data are given for materials in their standard state (at 25 °C [77 °F], 100 kPa). verify (what is ?) Infobox references

3′-Monoiodothyronine is a monoiodinated thyronine.
