= World Thyroid Day =

International observance, 26 may

- Observed by: European Thyroid Association
- Date: 25 May
- Next time: 25 May 2026
- Duration: One day
- Frequency: Annual

World Thyroid Day is observed every year on May 25. It is an international health awareness day aimed at informing the public about the importance of the thyroid gland and raising awareness about thyroid-related diseases. Thyroid disorders are considered one of the most common health issues globally. In India, around 42 million people suffer from thyroid problems, which poses a significant challenge to the country's public health system.

== History ==
At the annual general meeting of the Thyroid Federation International in September 2007, it was decided that May 25 would be observed as World Thyroid Day. The first World Thyroid Day was observed in 2008. Various member organizations hold events around the world. European Thyroid Association has also been observing this day annually on May 25 since 2008. It encourages thyroid groups and networks in Europe to organize events on this day.

== Significance ==
The thyroid gland produces thyroid hormones that are essential for normal growth, energy production, and metabolism. Thyroid dysfunction is common, easily detectable, and readily treatable. However, if left undiagnosed or untreated, it can have serious adverse effects. Globally, more than one billion people live in iodine-deficient regions, ranging from Southeast Asia and South America to Central Africa. Iodine is a vital component in the production of thyroid hormones. However, its global distribution is uneven, and remote mountainous areas often face shortages. Thyroid diseases in humans are often caused by insufficient intake of iodine-rich foods.

One of the main objectives of World Thyroid Day is to raise awareness so that people consume adequate iodine through their diet and seek appropriate treatment if affected by thyroid disorders.
