= Thyroxine 5-deiodinase =

Class of enzymes

DIO3

Identifiers
- Aliases: DIO3, 5DIII, D3, DIOIII, TXDI3, deiodinase, iodothyronine, type III, iodothyronine deiodinase 3, Dio3 Gene
- External IDs: OMIM: 601038; MGI: 1306782; GeneCards: DIO3
Available structures
PDB	Ortholog search: PDBe RCSB
PDB	List of PDB id codes 4TR3, 4TR4
Enzyme activity
EC #	BRENDA	ExPASy	KEGG	MetaCyc
1.21.99.3	↗	↗	↗	↗

Gene location (Human)
Chr.	Chromosome 14 (human)
Band	14q32.31	Start	101,561,351 bp
Band	14q32.31	End	101,563,452 bp

Gene location (Mouse)
Chr.	Chromosome 12 (mouse)
Band	12|12 F1	Start	110,245,502 bp
Band	12|12 F1	End	110,247,531 bp
RNA expression pattern
Bgee	Human / Mouse (ortholog); Top expressed in: canal of the cervix; tendon of biceps brachii; right ovary; left ovary; ectocervix; cartilage tissue; left uterine tube; tibial arteries; vagina; body of uterus / Top expressed in: placenta; yolk sac; stria vascularis; lip; embryo; morula; embryo; lens; ligament; auditory system; More reference expression data
BioGPS	n/a
Gene ontology
Molecular function	oxidoreductase activity; thyroxine 5-deiodinase activity; thyroxine 5'-deiodinase activity
Cellular component	integral component of membrane; endosome; plasma membrane; endosome membrane; membrane
Biological process	thyroid hormone generation; thyroid hormone catabolic process; hormone biosynthetic process; positive regulation of multicellular organism growth; apoptotic process; retinal cone cell development; biological process; negative regulation of eye photoreceptor cell development; retinal cone cell apoptotic process; thyroid hormone metabolic process; macromolecule metabolic process
Sources:Amigo / QuickGO
Orthologs
Databases	NCBI: entry; OMA: entry
Species	Human	Mouse
Entrez	1735	107585
Ensembl	ENSG00000197406	ENSMUSG00000075707
UniProt	P55073	Q91ZI8
RefSeq (mRNA)	NM_001362	NM_172119
RefSeq (protein)	NP_001353	NP_742117
Location (UCSC)	Chr 14: 101.56 – 101.56 Mb	Chr 12: 110.25 – 110.25 Mb
PubMed search
- Wikidata
View/Edit Human	View/Edit Mouse

Thyroxine 5-deiodinase also known as type III iodothyronine deiodinase (EC number 1.21.99.3) is an enzyme that in humans is encoded by the DIO3 gene. This enzyme catalyses the following chemical reaction

3,3',5'-triiodo-L-thyronine + iodide + A + H^{+} $\rightleftharpoons$ L-thyroxine + AH_{2}

The protein encoded by this intronless gene belongs to the iodothyronine deiodinase family. It catalyzes the inactivation of thyroid hormone by inner ring deiodination of the prohormone thyroxine (T_{4}) and the bioactive hormone 3,3',5-triiodothyronine (T_{3}) to inactive metabolites, 3,3',5'-triiodothyronine (RT_{3}) and 3,3'-diiodothyronine (T_{2}), respectively. This enzyme is highly expressed in the pregnant uterus, placenta, fetal and neonatal tissues, suggesting that it plays an essential role in the regulation of thyroid hormone inactivation during embryological development.

== Discovery ==
The gene was mapped to chromosome 14q32 using fluorescence in situ hybridization (FISH) in 1998.

== Structure ==
This protein contains a selenocysteine (Sec) residue, which is essential for efficient enzyme activity. The selenocysteine is encoded by the UGA codon, which normally signals translation termination. The 3' UTR of Sec-containing genes have a common stem-loop structure, the sec insertion sequence (SECIS), which is necessary for the recognition of UGA as a Sec codon rather than as a stop signal.

== Function ==
Thyroxine 5-deiodinase

Identifiers
- EC no.: 1.21.99.3
- CAS no.: 74506-30-2

Databases
- BRENDA: enzyme data
- ExPASy: NiceZyme view
- KEGG: enzyme entry
- MetaCyc: metabolic pathway
- Rhea: reactions
- PDB structures: RCSB PDB PDBe PDBsum
Search
- PMC: articles
- PubMed: articles
- NCBI: proteins

The DIO3 gene codes for type 3 iodothyronine deiodinase (D3), an enzyme that inactivates thyroid hormones and is highly expressed throughout fetal development, peaking early and decreasing towards the end of gestation. Part of the DLK1-Dio3 imprinting control region, this gene is one involved in the epigenetic process that causes a subset of genes to be regulated based on their parental origin . Such imprinted genes are required for the formation of the placenta as well as the development of cellular lineages such as those derived from the mesoderm and ectoderm. D3 is found in the pregnant uterus, placenta, and mammalian fetal tissues where it is thought to be involved in the transfer of thyroid hormone between the mother and fetus. Expression of D3 contributes to the development of the brain, skin, liver, bone, ovary, testis, intestine, and brown adipose tissue. Introductory observations of D3-deficient mice indicate growth retardation and even some neonatal death. Due to its ability to activate or inactivate thyroid hormone, Dio3 coding of D3 could be a target for therapeutic intervention in insulin-related illness such as diabetes. In addition, an abnormal amount of Dio3 related to insufficient thyroid hormone levels could be responsible for the disruption of brain development in conjunction with alcohol exposure. Many factors modify genetic imprinting of Dio3, making it a potential aid in understanding prenatal insults and their production of spectrum disorders.
