= 3-Iodotyrosine =

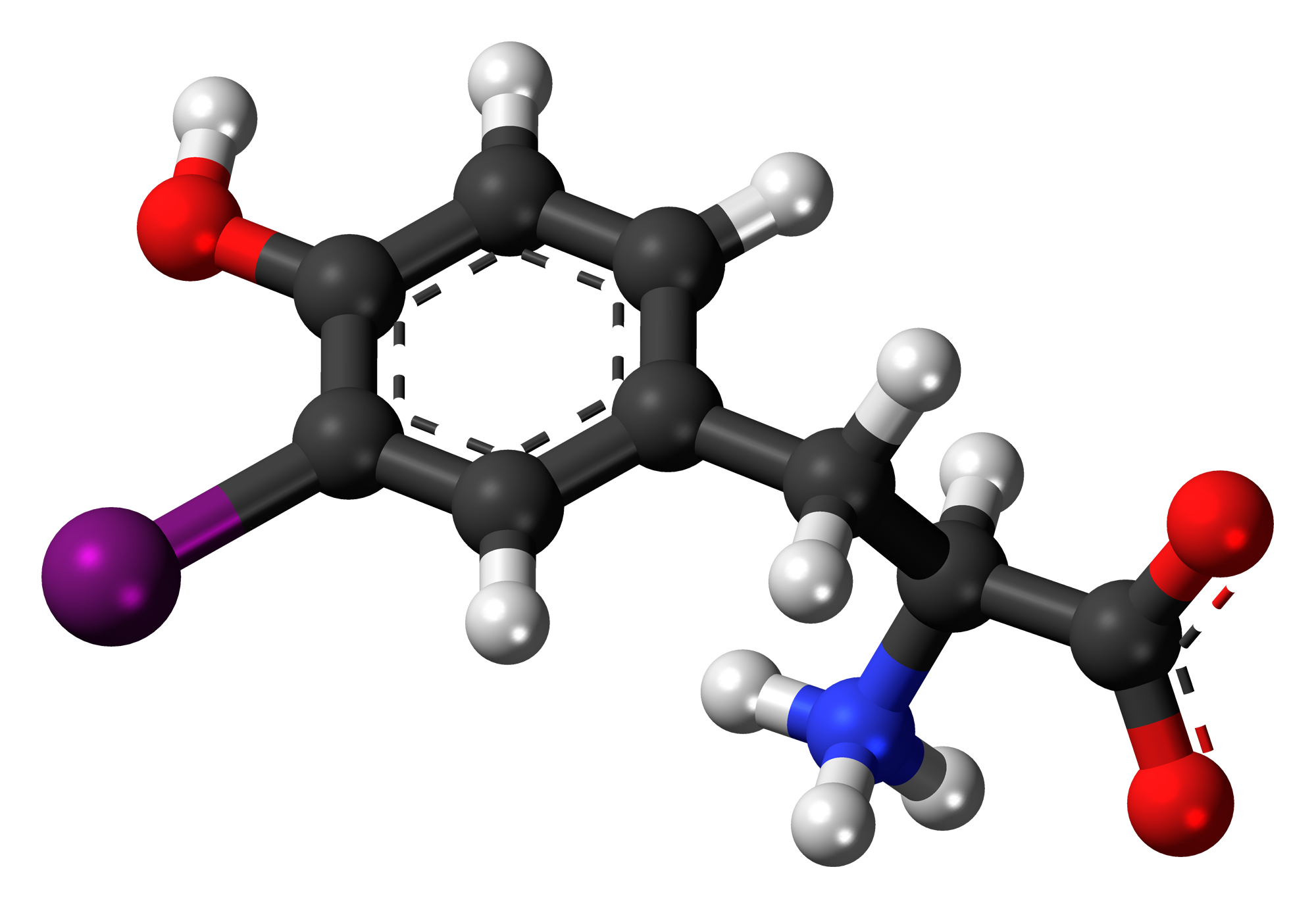
- 3-Iodo-L-tyrosine

Names
- IUPAC name 3-Iodotyrosine
- Systematic IUPAC name 2-Amino-3-(4-hydroxy-3-iodophenyl)propanoic acid
- Other names Monoiodotyrosine; MIT

Identifiers
CAS Number	3078-39-5 (DL); 70-78-0 (L); 25799-58-0 (D)
3D model (JSmol)	Interactive image
ChEMBL	ChEMBL479789
ChemSpider	388804
DrugBank	DB01758
ECHA InfoCard	100.000.677
IUPHAR/BPS	5117
MeSH	Monoiodotyrosine
PubChem CID	6272 (DL); 439744 (L)
UNII	FRQ98U4U27
CompTox Dashboard (EPA)	DTXSID1075353
- InChI: InChI=1S/C9H10INO3/c10-6-3-5(1-2-8(6)12)4-7(11)9(13)14/h1-3,7,12H,4,11H2,(H,13,14)/t7-/m0/s1 Key: UQTZMGFTRHFAAM-ZETCQYMHSA-N; InChI=1/C9H10INO3/c10-6-3-5(1-2-8(6)12)4-7(11)9(13)14/h1-3,7,12H,4,11H2,(H,13,14)/t7-/m0/s1 Key: UQTZMGFTRHFAAM-ZETCQYMHBY
- SMILES: c1cc(c(cc1C[C@@H](C(=O)O)N)I)O

Properties
Chemical formula	C_{9}H_{10}INO_{3}
Molar mass	307.087 g·mol^{−1}
- Except where otherwise noted, data are given for materials in their standard state (at 25 °C [77 °F], 100 kPa). verify (what is ?) Infobox references

3-Iodotyrosine is an intermediate in the synthesis of thyroid hormones which is derived from iodination of tyrosine at the meta-position of the benzene ring. One unit can combine with diiodotyrosine to form triiodothyronine, as occurs in the colloid of the thyroid follicle. Two units can combine to form 3,3'-diiodothyronine.

3-Iodotyrosine is a reversible inhibitor of the enzyme tyrosine hydroxylase.

== Relevance in dopamine studies ==
3-Iodotyrosine, a pathway inhibitor in the synthesis of the neurotransmitter dopamine, was used to determine the effects of decreased dopamine levels in social spacing of Drosophila melanogaster. 3-4 day old flies that were fed 3-iodotyrosine for 24 hours were shown to have altered dopamine levels.
