= DIO2 =

Protein-coding gene in humans

Identifiers
- Aliases: DIO2, 5DII, D2, DIOII, SelY, TXDI2, deiodinase, iodothyronine, type II, iodothyronine deiodinase 2, SELENOY
- External IDs: OMIM: 601413; MGI: 1338833; GeneCards: DIO2
Enzyme activity
EC #	BRENDA	ExPASy	KEGG	MetaCyc
1.21.99.4	↗	↗	↗	↗

Gene location (Human)
Chr.	Chromosome 14 (human)
Band	14q31.1	Start	80,197,526 bp
Band	14q31.1	End	80,387,757 bp

Gene location (Mouse)
Chr.	Chromosome 12 (mouse)
Band	12|12 D3	Start	90,691,326 bp
Band	12|12 D3	End	90,705,212 bp
RNA expression pattern
Bgee	Human / Mouse (ortholog); Top expressed in: mucosa of pharynx; tendon of biceps brachii; body of tongue; superior surface of tongue; oral cavity; thyroid gland; right lobe of thyroid gland; nipple; human penis; left lobe of thyroid gland / Top expressed in: median eminence; cervix; ascending aorta; ligament; Region I of hippocampus proper; arcuate nucleus; lumbar subsegment of spinal cord; aortic valve; spiral ligament; perirhinal cortex; More reference expression data
BioGPS	n/a
Gene ontology
Molecular function	oxidoreductase activity; selenium binding; thyroxine 5'-deiodinase activity; ubiquitin protein ligase binding
Cellular component	integral component of membrane; plasma membrane; membrane
Biological process	thyroid hormone metabolic process; thyroid hormone generation; selenocysteine incorporation; hormone biosynthetic process; positive regulation of cold-induced thermogenesis
Sources:Amigo / QuickGO
Orthologs
Databases	NCBI: entry; OMA: entry
Species	Human	Mouse
Entrez	1734	13371
Ensembl	ENSG00000211448	ENSMUSG00000007682
UniProt	Q92813	Q9Z1Y9
RefSeq (mRNA)	NM_013989; NM_000793; NM_001007023; NM_001242503; NM_001324462 NM_001366496	NM_010050
RefSeq (protein)	NP_000784; NP_001311391; NP_054644; NP_001353425	NP_034180
Location (UCSC)	Chr 14: 80.2 – 80.39 Mb	Chr 12: 90.69 – 90.71 Mb
PubMed search
- Wikidata
View/Edit Human	View/Edit Mouse

Type II iodothyronine deiodinase (iodothyronine 5'-deiodinase, iodothyronine 5'-monodeiodinase) is an enzyme that in humans is encoded by the DIO2 gene.

== Function ==
The protein encoded by this gene belongs to the iodothyronine deiodinase family. It activates thyroid hormone by converting the prohormone thyroxine (T_{4}) by outer ring deiodination (ORD) to bioactive 3,3',5-triiodothyronine (T_{3}). It is highly expressed in the thyroid, and may contribute significantly to the relative increase in thyroidal T_{3} production in patients with Graves' disease and thyroid adenomas. This protein contains selenocysteine (Sec) residues encoded by the UGA codon, which normally signals translation termination. The 3' UTR of Sec-containing genes have a common stem-loop structure, the Sec insertion sequence (SECIS), which is necessary for the recognition of UGA as a Sec codon rather than as a stop signal. Alternative splicing results in multiple transcript variants encoding different isoforms.

== Interactions ==
DIO2 has been shown to interact with USP33.

== See also ==
- Deiodinase
