= Thyroxine-binding globulin =

Mammalian protein found in Homo sapiens

SERPINA7
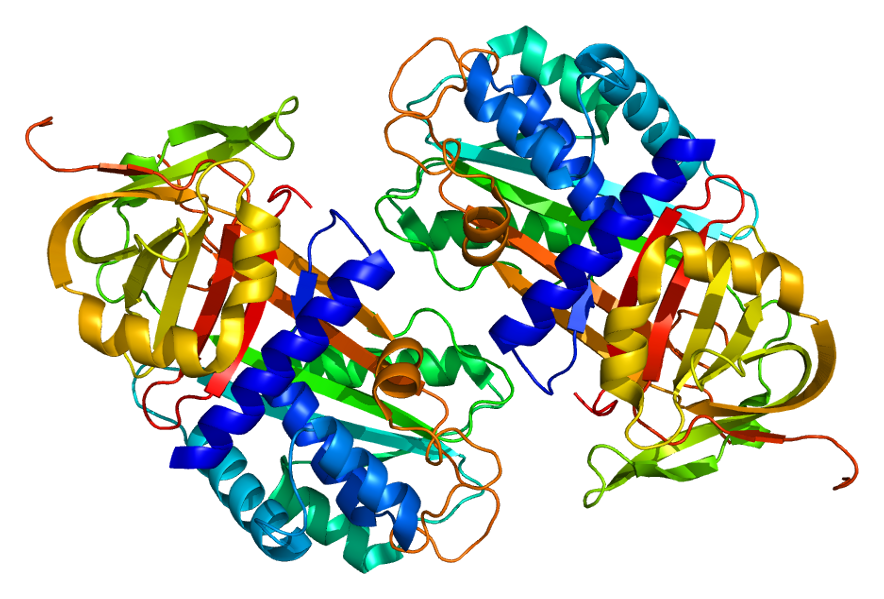

Identifiers
- Aliases: SERPINA7, TBG, serpin family A member 7, Thyroxine-binding globulin，TBG, TBGQTL
- External IDs: OMIM: 314200; MGI: 3041197; GeneCards: SERPINA7
Available structures
PDB	Ortholog search: PDBe RCSB
PDB	List of PDB id codes 2CEO, 2RIV, 2RIW, 2XN3, 2XN5, 2XN6, 2XN7, 4X30, 4YIA

Gene location (Human)
Chr.	X chromosome (human)
Band	Xq22.3	Start	106,032,435 bp
Band	Xq22.3	End	106,038,727 bp

Gene location (Mouse)
Chr.	X chromosome (mouse)
Band	X|X F1	Start	137,980,006 bp
Band	X|X F1	End	137,985,985 bp
RNA expression pattern
Bgee	Human / Mouse (ortholog); Top expressed in: liver; right lobe of liver; skin of thigh; renal cortex; body of pancreas; small intestine; human kidney; fallopian tube; rectum; lower lobe of lung / Top expressed in: liver; left lobe of liver; embryo; islet of Langerhans; sexually immature organism; epithelium of stomach; spermatid; lumbar subsegment of spinal cord; thymus; ureter; More reference expression data
BioGPS	n/a
Gene ontology
Molecular function	serine-type endopeptidase inhibitor activity
Cellular component	extracellular exosome; extracellular region; extracellular space
Biological process	thyroid hormone transport; negative regulation of endopeptidase activity
Sources:Amigo / QuickGO
Orthologs
Databases	NCBI: entry; OMA: entry
Species	Human	Mouse
Entrez	6906	331535
Ensembl	ENSG00000123561	ENSMUSG00000031271
UniProt	P05543	P61939
RefSeq (mRNA)	NM_000354	NM_177920; NM_001382371; NM_001382372
RefSeq (protein)	NP_000345	NP_808588; NP_001369300; NP_001369301
Location (UCSC)	Chr X: 106.03 – 106.04 Mb	Chr X: 137.98 – 137.99 Mb
PubMed search
- Wikidata
View/Edit Human	View/Edit Mouse

Thyroxine-binding globulin (TBG) is a globulin protein encoded by the SERPINA7 gene in humans. TBG binds thyroid hormones in circulation. It is one of three transport proteins (along with transthyretin and serum albumin) responsible for carrying the thyroid hormones thyroxine (T_{4}) and triiodothyronine (T_{3}) in the bloodstream. Of these three proteins, TBG has the highest affinity for T_{4} and T_{3} but is present in the lowest concentration relative to transthyretin and albumin, which also bind T3 and T4 in circulation. Despite its low concentration, TBG carries the majority of T_{4} in the blood plasma. Due to the very low concentration of T_{4} and T_{3} in the blood, TBG is rarely more than 25% saturated with its ligand. Unlike transthyretin and albumin, TBG has a single binding site for T_{4}/T_{3}. TBG is synthesized primarily in the liver as a 54-kDa protein.In terms of genomics, TBG is a serpin; however, it has no inhibitory function like many other members of this class of proteins.

== Role in diagnosis ==
Thyroxine-binding globulin tests are sometimes used to find the cause of raised or lowered levels of thyroid hormone. This is done by measuring resin binding to labeled thyroid hormone, which happens only when the labeled thyroid hormone is free (unbound) in the bloodstream.

The patient's serum is mixed with the labeled thyroid hormone; next, the resin is added to the whole mixture to measure the amount of free labeled thyroid hormone. So, for instance, if the patient is truly hypothyroid, and TBG levels are normal, then there are many sites open for binding on the TBG, since the total thyroid hormone level is low. Therefore, when the labeled hormone is added, it will bind mostly to the TBG, leaving little of it left for binding to the resin. In contrast, however, if the patient is truly hyperthyroid, and TBG levels are normal, the patient's endogenous hormone will saturate the TBG binding sites more, leaving less room for the labeled hormone, which allows greater binding to the resin.

In patients who are truly hypo- or hyperthyroid, TBG testing is not very useful. However, if total thyroid hormone levels point to hypothyroidism or hyperthyroidism in the absence of accompanying symptoms, the utility of TBG testing becomes more evident, since TBG production can be modified by other factors such as estrogen levels, corticosteroid levels, or liver failure. If, for example, the TBG level is high, which can occur when estrogen levels are high, the TBG will bind more thyroid hormone, decreasing the free hormone available in the blood, which leads to stimulation of TSH, and the production of more thyroid hormone. In this case, the total thyroid hormone level will be high. And so, when labeled hormone is added, since TBG is so high, once equilibrium between the binding of endogenous thyroid hormone and the labeled hormone is achieved, less free labeled hormone will be available for uptake into the resin. On the converse, in the presence of corticosteroids, which lower TBG levels, the total thyroid hormone (bound and free) in the blood will be low. Thus, when the labeled hormone is added, since so little TBG is available in the blood, after equilibrium is achieved, only a small portion of it will bind, leaving plenty available for uptake by the resin.
