= Thyronine =

L-Thyronine
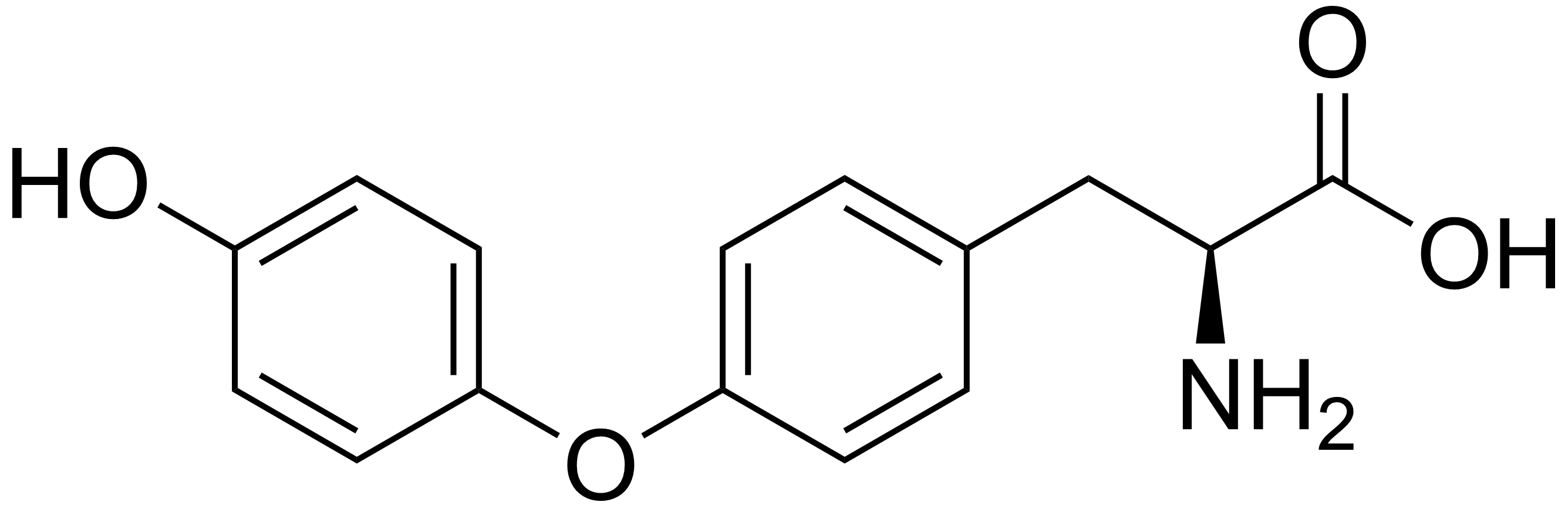

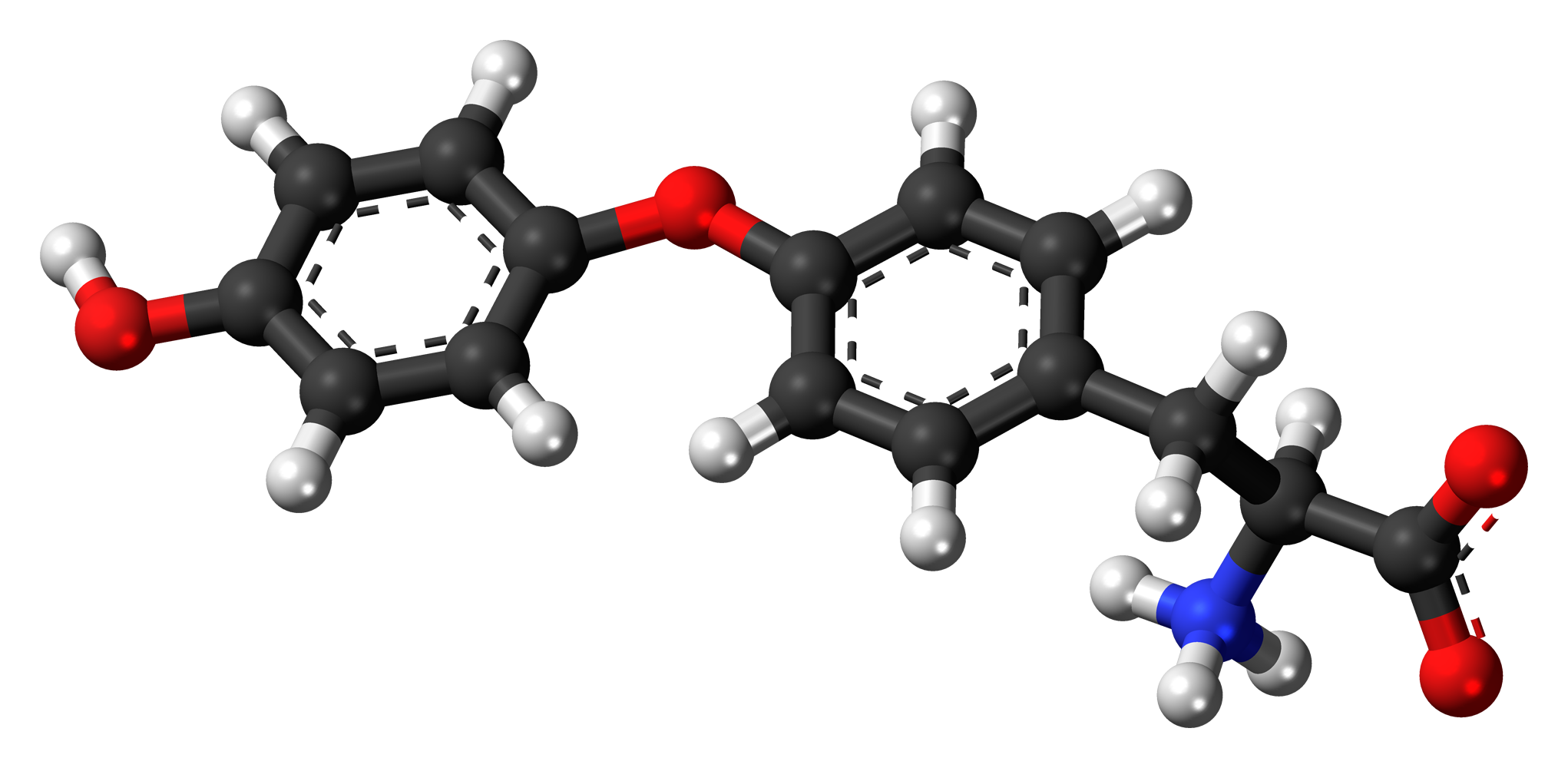

Names
- IUPAC name O-(4-Hydroxyphenyl)-L-tyrosine
- Systematic IUPAC name (2S)-2-Amino-3-[4-(4-hydroxyphenoxy)phenyl]propanoic acid
- Other names 4-(4-Hydroxyphenoxy)-L-phenylalanine

Identifiers
CAS Number	1596-67-4
3D model (JSmol)	Interactive image
ChEBI	CHEBI:30662
ChemSpider	4574450
ECHA InfoCard	100.014.986
PubChem CID	5461103
UNII	E4QN8G00CV
CompTox Dashboard (EPA)	DTXSID801318222
- InChI: InChI=1S/C15H15NO4/c16-14(15(18)19)9-10-1-5-12(6-2-10)20-13-7-3-11(17)4-8-13/h1-8,14,17H,9,16H2,(H,18,19)/t14-/m0/s1 Key: KKCIOUWDFWQUBT-AWEZNQCLSA-N; InChI=1/C15H15NO4/c16-14(15(18)19)9-10-1-5-12(6-2-10)20-13-7-3-11(17)4-8-13/h1-8,14,17H,9,16H2,(H,18,19)/t14-/m0/s1 Key: KKCIOUWDFWQUBT-AWEZNQCLBR
- SMILES: O=C(O)[C@@H](N)Cc2ccc(Oc1ccc(O)cc1)cc2

Properties
Chemical formula	C_{15}H_{15}NO_{4}
Molar mass	273.28 g/mol
- Except where otherwise noted, data are given for materials in their standard state (at 25 °C [77 °F], 100 kPa). verify (what is ?) Infobox references

Thyronine is a metabolite derived from thyroxine and triiodothyronine via the peripheral enzymatic removal of iodines from the thyroxine nucleus. Thyronine is the thyroxine nucleus devoid of its four iodine atoms.
