= Diiodotyrosine =

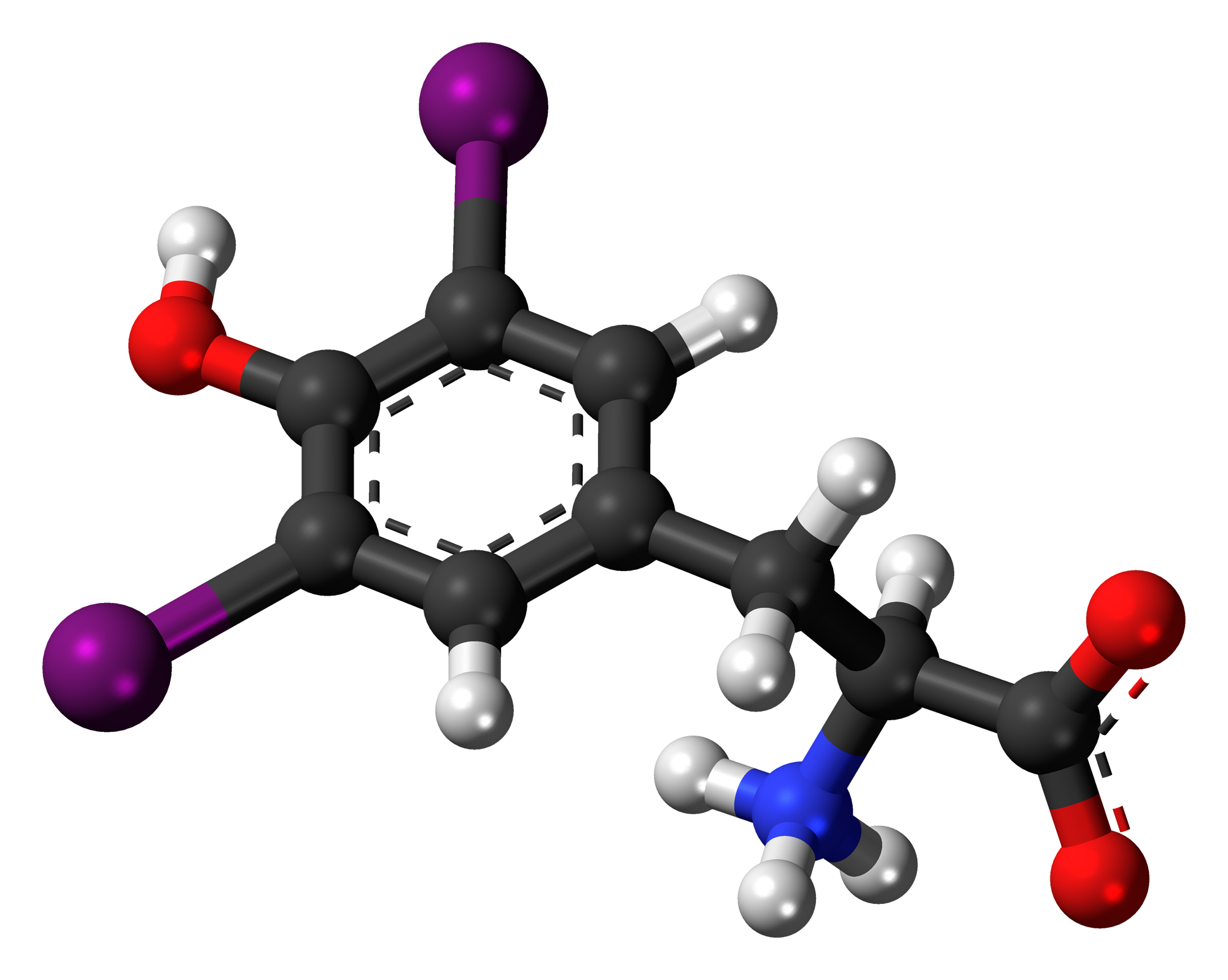

Names
- Preferred IUPAC name (2S)-2-Amino-3-(4-hydroxy-3,5-diiodophenyl)propanoic acid

Identifiers
CAS Number	66-02-4
3D model (JSmol)	Interactive image
ChemSpider	8946
ECHA InfoCard	100.005.539
IUPHAR/BPS	6651
MeSH	Diiodotyrosine
PubChem CID	6181; 7058163
UNII	ST90Q60YF3
CompTox Dashboard (EPA)	DTXSID0048680
- InChI: InChI=1S/C9H9I2NO3/c10-5-1-4(2-6(11)8(5)13)3-7(12)9(14)15/h1-2,7,13H,3,12H2,(H,14,15)/t7-/m0/s1 Key: NYPYHUZRZVSYKL-ZETCQYMHSA-N; InChI=1/C9H9I2NO3/c10-5-1-4(2-6(11)8(5)13)3-7(12)9(14)15/h1-2,7,13H,3,12H2,(H,14,15)/t7-/m0/s1 Key: NYPYHUZRZVSYKL-ZETCQYMHBZ
- SMILES: Ic1cc(cc(I)c1O)C[C@@H](C(=O)O)N

Properties
Chemical formula	C_{9}H_{9}I_{2}NO_{3}
Molar mass	432.982 g/mol
- Except where otherwise noted, data are given for materials in their standard state (at 25 °C [77 °F], 100 kPa). verify (what is ?) Infobox references

Diiodotyrosine (DIT) is a precursor in the production of thyroid hormone, and results from iodization of monoiodotyrosine at the other meta- position on the phenol ring.

== Function ==
DIT is a modulator of the enzyme thyroid peroxidase (which is involved in the production of thyroid hormones).

Triiodothyronine is formed, when diiodotyrosine is combined with monoiodotyrosine (in the colloid of the thyroid follicle) in a coupling reaction.

Two molecules of DIT combine to make the thyroid hormone thyroxine ('T4' and 'T3').

== See also ==
- Diiodotyrosine transaminase
