= 3,3'-Diiodothyronine =

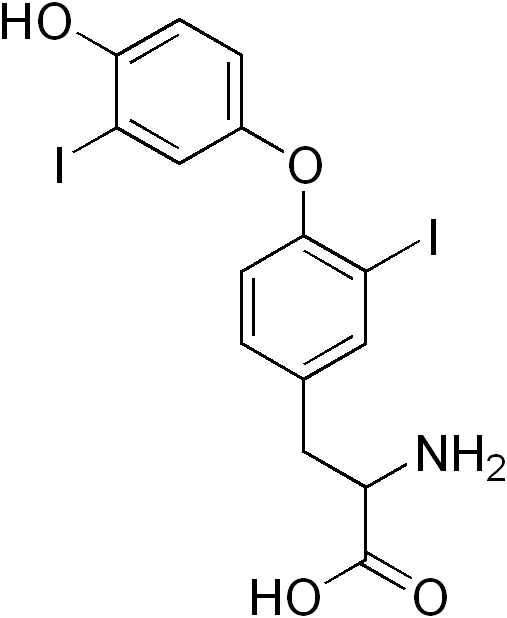

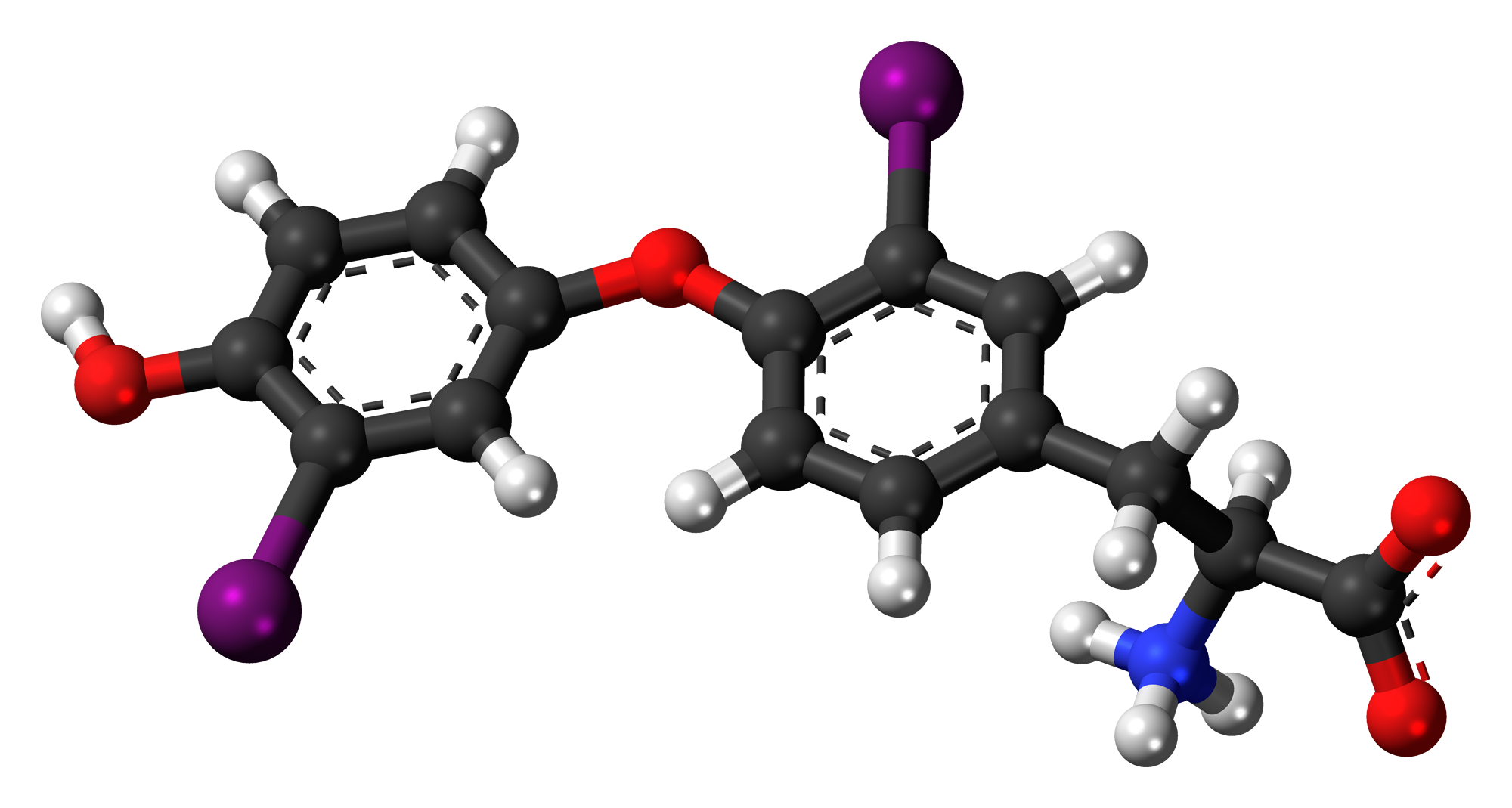

Names
- IUPAC name 3,3′-Diiodo-DL-thyronine
- Systematic IUPAC name 2-Amino-3-[4-(4-Hydroxy-3-iodophenoxy)-3-iodophenyl]propanoic acid
- Other names O-(4-Hydroxy-3-iodophenyl)-3-iodotyrosine

Identifiers
CAS Number	70-40-6
3D model (JSmol)	Interactive image; Interactive image
ChEBI	CHEBI:35430
ChemSpider	59002
IUPHAR/BPS	6648
MeSH	3,3'-diiodothyronine
PubChem CID	65559
UNII	GNC4MZ8B3Q
CompTox Dashboard (EPA)	DTXSID401018947
- InChI: InChI=1S/C15H13I2NO4/c16-10-7-9(2-3-13(10)19)22-14-4-1-8(5-11(14)17)6-12(18)15(20)21/h1-5,7,12,19H,6,18H2,(H,20,21) Key: CPCJBZABTUOGNM-UHFFFAOYSA-N; InChI=1/C15H13I2NO4/c16-10-7-9(2-3-13(10)19)22-14-4-1-8(5-11(14)17)6-12(18)15(20)21/h1-5,7,12,19H,6,18H2,(H,20,21) Key: CPCJBZABTUOGNM-UHFFFAOYAW
- SMILES: NC(C(O)=O)CC1=CC(I)=C(OC2=CC=C(O)C(I)=C2)C=C1; O=C(O)C(N)Cc2ccc(Oc1cc(I)c(O)cc1)c(I)c2

Properties
Chemical formula	C_{15}H_{13}I_{2}NO_{4}
Molar mass	525.077 g/mol
- Except where otherwise noted, data are given for materials in their standard state (at 25 °C [77 °F], 100 kPa). verify (what is ?) Infobox references

3,3'-Diiodothyronine, also known as 3,3'-T_{2}, is a metabolite of thyroid hormone.

It is formed from the breakdown of triiodothyronine. Levels can be affected in certain disease states.

== Reactions ==
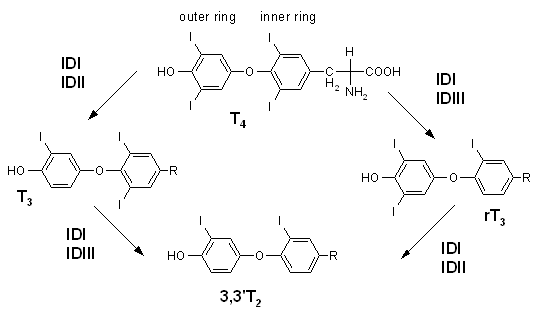
Synthesis of T_{2} from T_{3}, and from reverse T3
