= Diiodothyronine =

Diiodothyronine may refer to:

- 3,3'-Diiodothyronine (3,3'-T_{2})
- 3,5-Diiodothyronine (3,5-T_{2})
