= 3,5-Diiodothyronine =

Names
- IUPAC name 2-Amino-3-[4-(4-hydroxyphenoxy)-3,5-diiodophenyl]propanoic acid

Identifiers
CAS Number	534-51-0
3D model (JSmol)	Interactive image; Interactive image
ChemSpider	110252
MeSH	3,5-diiodothyronine
PubChem CID	123675
UNII	U1Y9GN485M
CompTox Dashboard (EPA)	DTXSID60862141
- InChI: InChI=1S/C15H13I2NO4/c16-11-5-8(7-13(18)15(20)21)6-12(17)14(11)22-10-3-1-9(19)2-4-10/h1-6,13,19H,7,18H2,(H,20,21) Key: ZHSOTLOTTDYIIK-UHFFFAOYSA-N
- SMILES: C1=CC(=CC=C1O)OC2=C(C=C(C=C2I)CC(C(=O)O)N)I; C1=CC(=CC=C1O)OC2=C(C=C(C=C2I)CC(C(=O)O)N)I

Properties
Chemical formula	C_{15}H_{13}I_{2}NO_{4}
Molar mass	525.081 g·mol^{−1}
- Except where otherwise noted, data are given for materials in their standard state (at 25 °C [77 °F], 100 kPa). Infobox references

3,5-Diiodothyronine (3,5-T_{2}) is an active thyroid hormone within the class of iodothyronines. It has two iodine atoms at positions 3 and 5 of its inner ring.

== Biological effects ==
3,5-T_{2} is an active thyroid hormone. It stimulates the TR-beta receptor for thyroid hormones and thus increases energy expenditure. It has agonistic (thyromimetic) effects at myocardial tissue and pituitary, which results in 3,5-T_{2} suppressing TSH release. 3,5-T_{2} is an allosteric regulator of the cytochrome c oxidase, the complex IV of the electron transport chain. It increases its activity by preventing the interaction of adenosine triphosphate (ATP) as an allosteric inhibitor.

== Clinical significance ==
In nonthyroidal illness syndrome 3,5-T_{2} concentrations are increased. This could explain why patients with low T3 syndrome don't benefit from substitution therapy with thyroid hormones.
