= Reverse triiodothyronine =

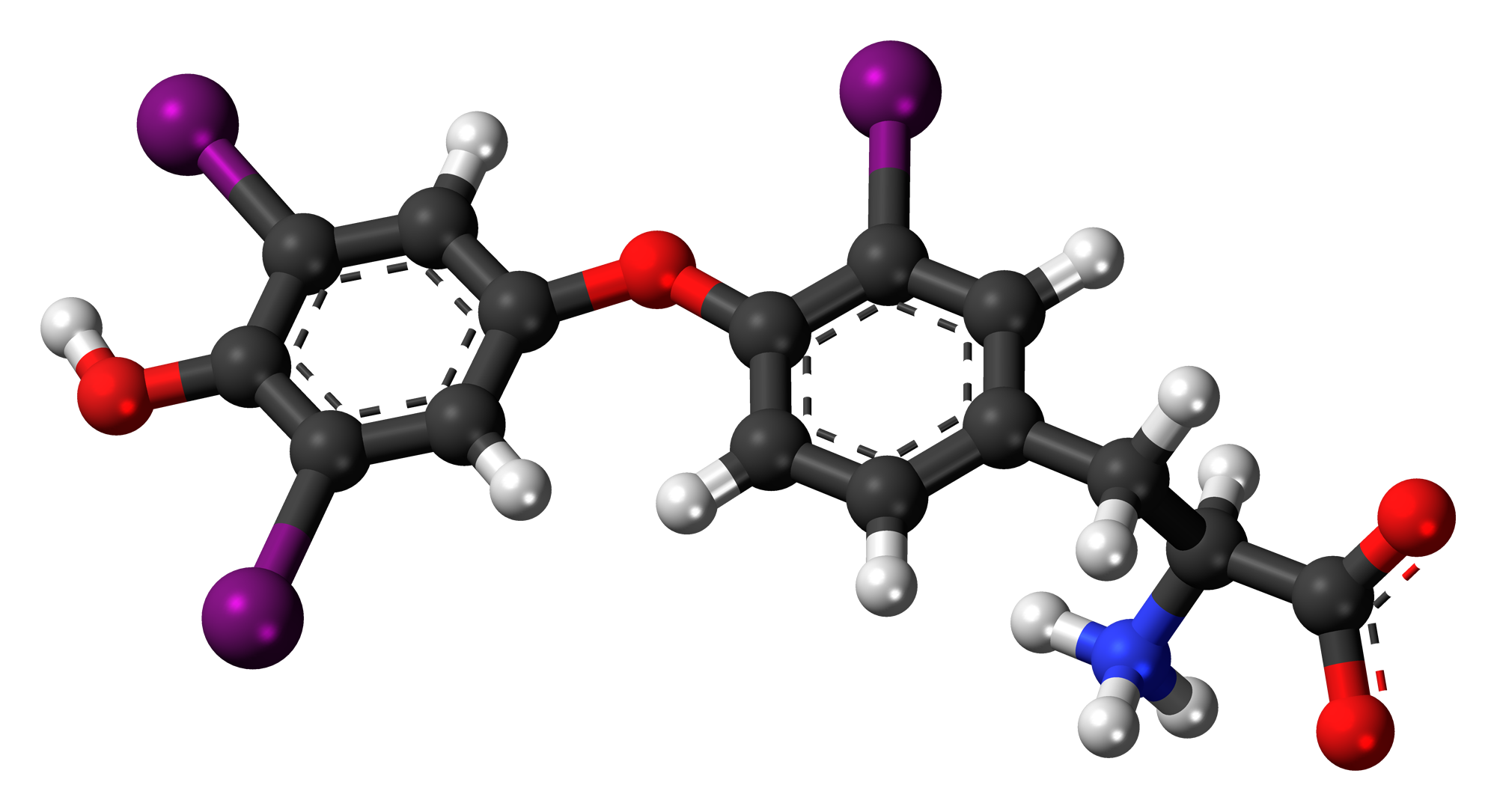

Names
- IUPAC name O-(4-Hydroxy-3,5-diiodophenyl)-3-iodo-L-tyrosine
- Systematic IUPAC name (2S)-2-Amino-3-[4-(4-hydroxy-3,5-diiodophenoxy)-3-iodophenyl]propanoic acid
- Other names reverse triiodothyronine reverse T_{3} rT_{3} 3,3′,5′-triiodothyronine

Identifiers
CAS Number	5817-39-0
3D model (JSmol)	Interactive image
ChEBI	CHEBI:11684
ChemSpider	559294
IUPHAR/BPS	2636
KEGG	C07639
MeSH	Reverse+triiodothyronine
PubChem CID	22069
UNII	8NZ4Y08T96
CompTox Dashboard (EPA)	DTXSID50859929 DTXSID00274724, DTXSID50859929
- InChI: InChI=1S/C15H12I3NO4/c16-9-3-7(4-12(19)15(21)22)1-2-13(9)23-8-5-10(17)14(20)11(18)6-8/h1-3,5-6,12,20H,4,19H2,(H,21,22)/t12-/m0/s1 Key: HZCBWYNLGPIQRK-LBPRGKRZSA-N; InChI=1/C15H12I3NO4/c16-9-3-7(4-12(19)15(21)22)1-2-13(9)23-8-5-10(17)14(20)11(18)6-8/h1-3,5-6,12,20H,4,19H2,(H,21,22)/t12-/m0/s1 Key: HZCBWYNLGPIQRK-LBPRGKRZBV
- SMILES: C1=CC(=C(C=C1C[C@@H](C(=O)O)N)I)OC2=CC(=C(C(=C2)I)O)I

Properties
Chemical formula	C_{15}H_{12}I_{3}NO_{4}
Molar mass	650.974
- Except where otherwise noted, data are given for materials in their standard state (at 25 °C [77 °F], 100 kPa). verify (what is ?) Infobox references

Reverse triiodothyronine, also known as rT_{3}, is an isomer of triiodothyronine (T_{3}).

Reverse T_{3} is the third-most common iodothyronine the thyroid gland releases into the bloodstream, at 0.9%; tetraiodothyronine (levothyroxine, T_{4}) constitutes 90% and T_{3} is 9%. However, 95% of rT_{3} in human blood is made elsewhere in the body, as enzymes remove a particular iodine atom from T_{4}.

The production of hormone by the thyroid gland is controlled by the hypothalamus and pituitary gland. The physiological activity of thyroid hormone is regulated by a system of enzymes that activate, inactivate or simply discard the prohormone T_{4} and in turn functionally modify T_{3} and rT_{3}. These enzymes operate under complex direction of systems including neurotransmitters, hormones, markers of metabolism and immunological signals.

The levels of rT_{3} increase in conditions such as euthyroid sick syndrome because its clearance decreases while its production stays the same. The decreased clearance is possibly from lower thyroxine 5-deiodinase activity in the peripheral tissue or decreased liver uptake of rT_{3}. In addition, increased rT_{3} concentrations result from upregulated thyroxine 5-deiodinase activity in critical illness, starvation and fetal life.

== Reactions ==
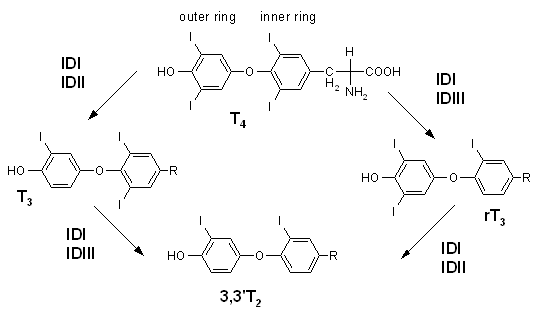
Synthesis of Reverse T_{3} from T_{4} via deiodination. Synthesis of T_{3} and T_{2} is also shown.
