= Triiodothyronine =

- Skeletal formula

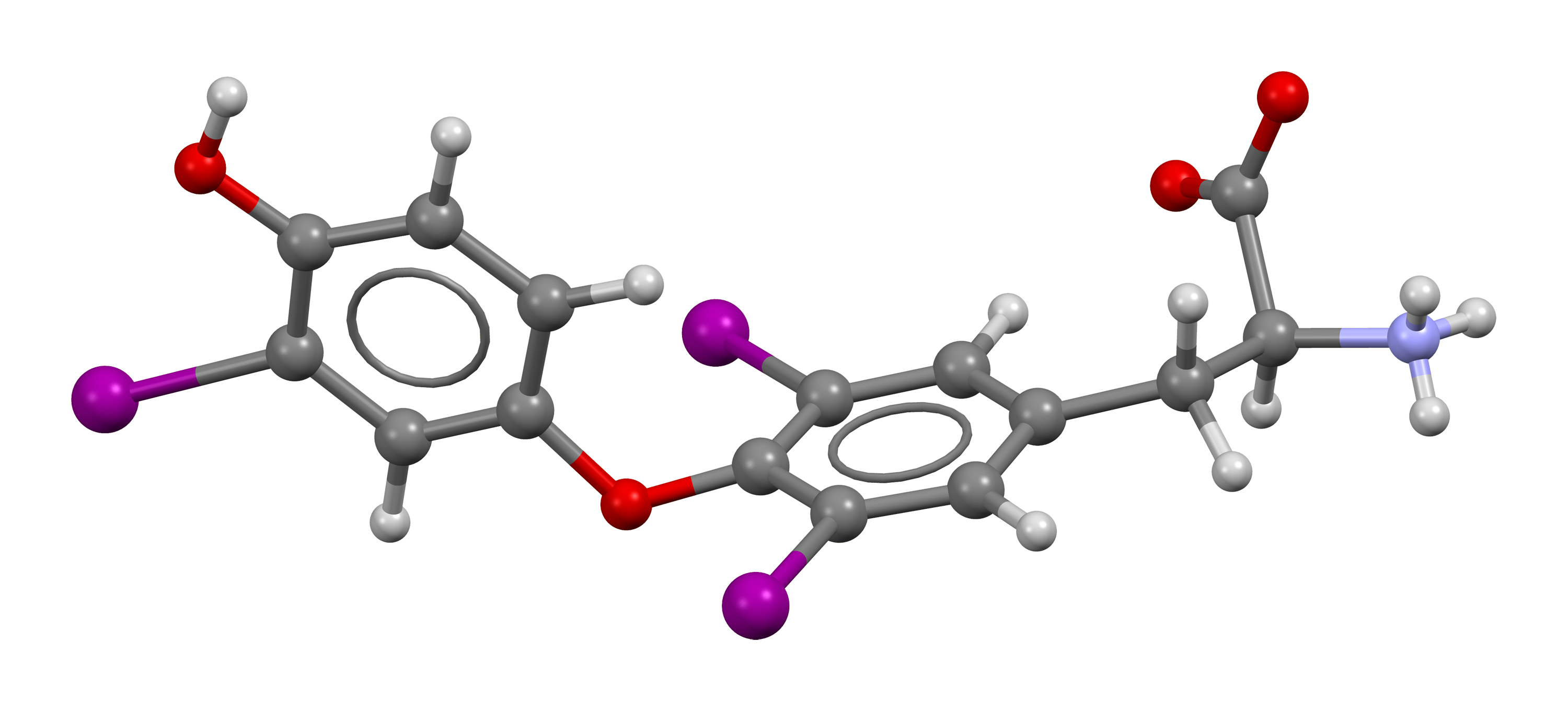
- Ball-and-stick model

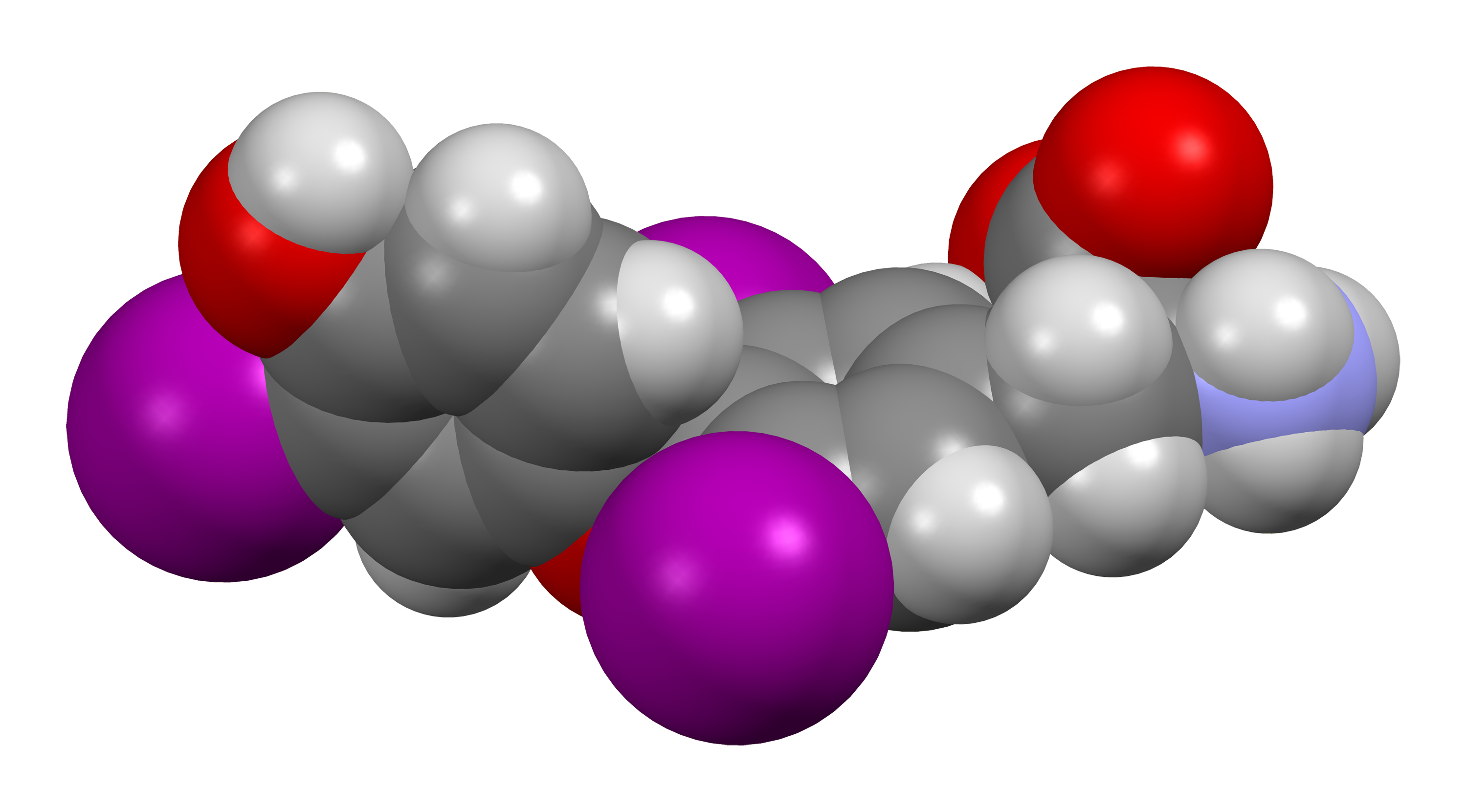
- Space-filling model

Names
- IUPAC name (2S)-2-amino-3-[4-(4-hydroxy-3-iodophenoxy)-3,5-diiodophenyl]propanoic acid
- Other names triiodothyronine T_{3} 3,3′,5-triiodo-L-thyronine

Identifiers
CAS Number	6893-02-3
3D model (JSmol)	Interactive image
Beilstein Reference	2710227
ChEBI	CHEBI:18258
ChEMBL	ChEMBL1544
ChemSpider	5707
DrugBank	DB00279
ECHA InfoCard	100.027.272
EC Number	229-999-3
IUPHAR/BPS	2634
KEGG	C02465
PubChem CID	5920
UNII	06LU7C9H1V
CompTox Dashboard (EPA)	DTXSID8023216
- InChI: InChI=1S/C15H12I3NO4/c16-9-6-8(1-2-13(9)20)23-14-10(17)3-7(4-11(14)18)5-12(19)15(21)22/h1-4,6,12,20H,5,19H2,(H,21,22)/t12-/m0/s1 Key: AUYYCJSJGJYCDS-LBPRGKRZSA-N; InChI=1/C15H12I3NO4/c16-9-6-8(1-2-13(9)20)23-14-10(17)3-7(4-11(14)18)5-12(19)15(21)22/h1-4,6,12,20H,5,19H2,(H,21,22)/t12-/m0/s1 Key: AUYYCJSJGJYCDS-LBPRGKRZBY
- SMILES: OC(=O)[C@@H](N)Cc1cc(I)c(c(I)c1)Oc2ccc(O)c(I)c2

Properties
Chemical formula	C_{15}H_{12}I_{3}NO_{4}
Molar mass	650.977 g·mol^{−1}

Hazards
- GHS labelling
Pictograms	(GHS07: Exclamation mark)
Signal word	Warning
Hazard statements	H315, H319, H335
Precautionary statements	P261, P264, P271, P280, P302+P352, P304+P340, P305+P351+P338, P312, P321, P332+P313, P337+P313, P362, P403+P233, P405, P501
NFPA 704 (fire diamond)	1 1 0
- Except where otherwise noted, data are given for materials in their standard state (at 25 °C [77 °F], 100 kPa). verify (what is ?) Infobox references

Triiodothyronine, also known as T_{3}, is a thyroid hormone. It affects almost every physiological process in the body, including growth and development, metabolism, body temperature, and heart rate.

Production of T_{3} and its prohormone thyroxine (T_{4}) is activated by thyroid-stimulating hormone (TSH), which is released from the anterior pituitary gland. This pathway is part of a closed-loop feedback process: Elevated concentrations of T_{3}, and T_{4} in the blood plasma inhibit the production of TSH in the anterior pituitary gland. As concentrations of these hormones decrease, the anterior pituitary gland increases production of TSH, and by these processes, a feedback control system stabilizes the level of thyroid hormones in the bloodstream.

At the cellular level, T_{3} is the body's more active and potent thyroid hormone. T_{3} helps deliver oxygen and energy to all of the body's cells, its effects on target tissues being roughly four times more potent than those of T_{4}. Of the thyroid hormone that is produced, just about 20% is T_{3}, whereas 80% is produced as T_{4}. Roughly 85% of the circulating T_{3} is later formed in the liver and anterior pituitary by removal of the iodine atom from the carbon atom number five of the outer ring of T_{4}. In any case, the concentration of T_{3} in the human blood plasma is about one-fortieth that of T_{4}. The half-life of T_{3} is about 2.5 days. The half-life of T_{4} is about 6.5 days. T_{3} levels start to rise 45 minutes after administration and peak at about 2.5 hours. Although the manufacturer of Cytomel states half-life to be 2.5 days the half-life variability is great and can vary depending on the thyroid status of the patient. Newer studies have found the pharmacokinetics of T_{3} to be complex and the half-life to vary between 10 – 22 hours.

== Production ==
=== Synthesis from T_{4} ===
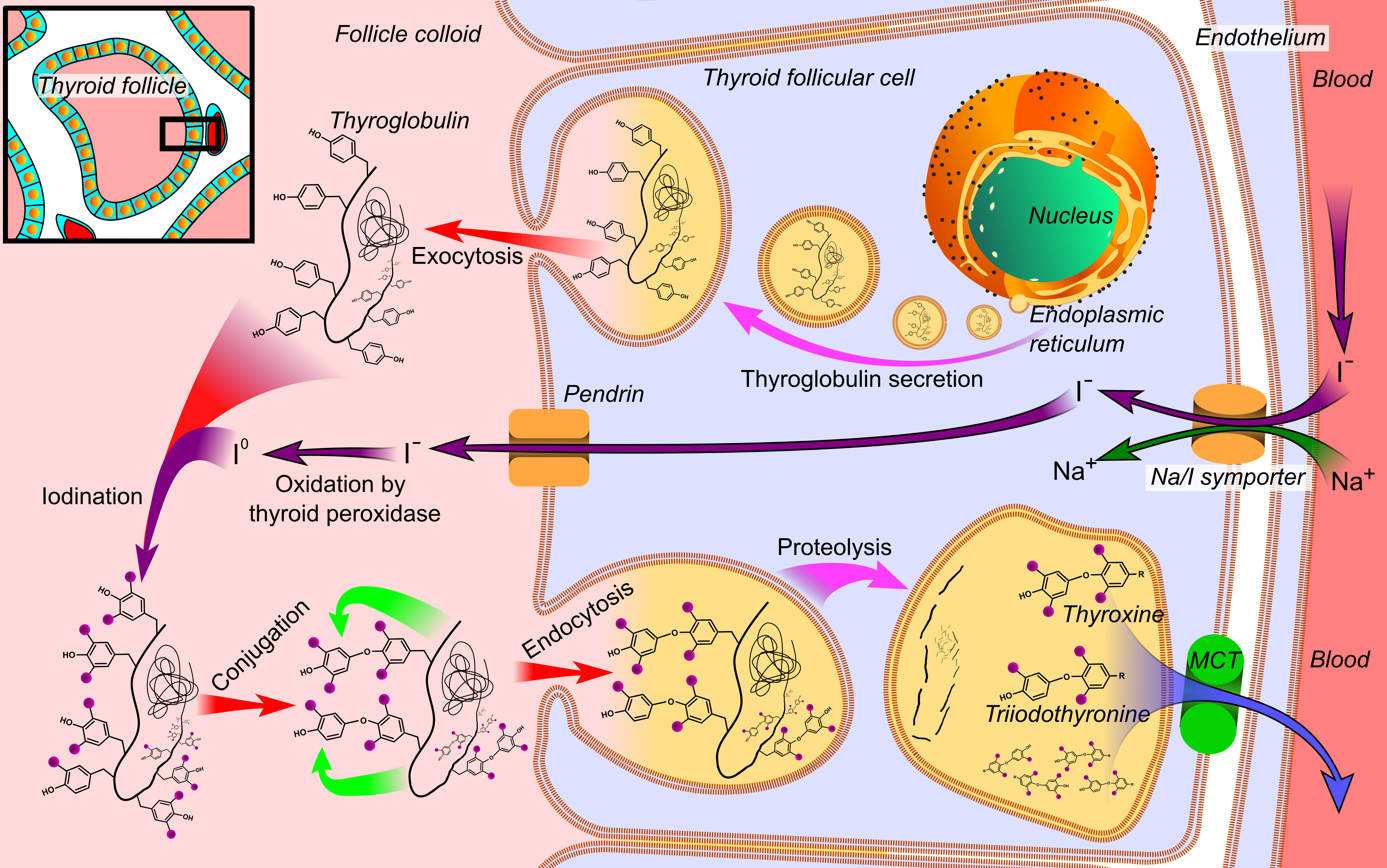
Thyroid hormone synthesis, with the end-product of triiodothyronine seen at bottom right

T_{3} is the more metabolically active hormone produced from T_{4}. T_{4} is deiodinated by three deiodinase enzymes to produce the more-active triiodothyronine:

1. Type I present in liver, kidney, thyroid, and (to a lesser extent) pituitary; it accounts for 80% of the deiodination of T_{4}.
2. Type II present in CNS, pituitary, brown adipose tissue, and heart vessel, which is predominantly intracellular. In the pituitary, it mediates negative feedback on thyroid-stimulating hormone.
3. Type III present in placenta, CNS, and hemangioma. This deiodinase converts T_{4} into reverse T_{3}, which, unlike T_{3}, is inactive.

T_{4} is synthesised in the thyroid follicular cell as follows.

1. The sodium-iodide symporter transports two sodium ions across the basement membrane of the follicular cells along with an iodine ion. This is a secondary active transporter that utilises the concentration gradient of Na^{+} to move I^{−} against its concentration gradient.
2. I^{−} is moved across the apical membrane into the colloid of the follicle.
3. Thyroperoxidase oxidises I^{−} to form the I radical.
4. The thyroperoxidase iodinates the tyrosyl residues of the thyroglobulin within the colloid. The thyroglobulin was synthesised in the ER of the follicular cell and secreted into the colloid.
5. Thyroid-stimulating hormone (TSH) released from the anterior pituitary gland binds the TSH receptor (a G_{s} protein-coupled receptor) on the basolateral membrane of the cell and stimulates the endocytosis of the colloid.
6. The endocytosed vesicles fuse with the lysosomes of the follicular cell. The lysosomal enzymes cleave the T_{4} from the iodinated thyroglobulin.
7. These vesicles are then exocytosed, releasing the thyroid hormones.

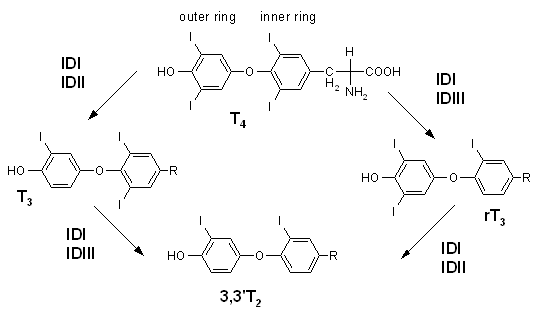
Synthesis of T_{3} from T_{4} via deiodination. Synthesis of reverse T_{3} and T_{2} is also shown.

=== Direct synthesis ===
The thyroid gland also produces small amounts of T_{3} directly. In the follicular lumen, tyrosine residues become iodinated. This reaction requires hydrogen peroxide. Iodine bonds carbon 3 or carbon 5 of tyrosine residues of thyroglobulin in a process called organification of iodine. The iodination of specific tyrosines yields monoiodotyrosine (MIT) and diiodotyrosine (DIT). One MIT and one DIT are enzymatically coupled to form T_{3}. The enzyme is thyroid peroxidase.

The small amount of T_{3} could be important because different tissues have different sensitivities to T_{4} due to differences in deiodinase ubiquitination in different tissues. This once again raises the question if T_{3} should be included in thyroid hormone replacement therapy (THRT).

== Mechanism of action ==
T_{3} and T_{4} bind to nuclear receptors (thyroid hormone receptors). T_{3} and T_{4}, although being lipophilic, are not able to passively diffuse through the phospholipid bilayers of target cells, instead relying on transmembrane iodothyronine transporters. The lipophilicity of T_{3} and T_{4} requires their binding to the protein carrier thyroid-binding protein (TBG) (thyroxine-binding globulins, thyroxine binding prealbumins, and albumins) for transport in the blood. The thyroid receptors bind to response elements in gene promoters, thus enabling them to activate or inhibit transcription. The sensitivity of a tissue to T_{3} is modulated through the thyroid receptors.

== Transportation ==
The system of the thyroid hormones T_{3} and T_{4}

T_{3} and T_{4} are carried in the blood, bound to plasma proteins. This has the effect of increasing the half-life of the hormone and decreasing the rate at which it is taken up by peripheral tissues. There are three main proteins that the two hormones are bound to. Thyroxine-binding globulin (TBG) is a glycoprotein that has a higher affinity for T_{4} than for T_{3}. Transthyretin is also a glycoprotein, but only carries T_{4}, with hardly any affinity at all for T_{3}. Finally, both hormones bind with a low affinity to serum albumin, but, due to the large availability of albumin, it has a high capacity.

The saturation of binding spots on thyronine-binding globulin (TBG) by endogenous T_{3} can be estimated by the triiodothyronine resin uptake test. The test is performed by taking a blood sample, to which an excess of radioactive exogenous T_{3} is added, followed by a resin that also binds T_{3}. A fraction of the radioactive T_{3} binds to sites on TBG not already occupied by endogenous thyroid hormone, and the remainder binds to the resin. The amount of labeled hormones bound to the resin is then subtracted from the total that was added, with the remainder thus being the amount that was bound to the unoccupied binding sites on TBG.

== Effects ==
T_{3} increases the basal metabolic rate and, thus, increases the body's oxygen and energy consumption. The basal metabolic rate is the minimal caloric requirement needed to sustain life in a resting individual. T_{3} acts on the majority of tissues within the body, with a few exceptions including the spleen. It increases the synthesis and activity of the Na^{+}/K^{+}-ATPase (which normally constitutes a substantial fraction of total cellular ATP expenditure) without disrupting transmembrane ion balance. In general, it increases the turnover of different endogenous macromolecules by increasing their synthesis and degradation.

=== Skeletal growth ===
Thyroid hormones are essential for normal growth and skeletal maturation. They potentiate the effect of growth hormone and somatomedins to promote bone growth, epiphysial closure and bone maturation.

=== Protein ===
T_{3} stimulates the production of RNA polymerase I and II and, therefore, increases the rate of protein synthesis. It also increases the rate of protein degradation, and, in excess, the rate of protein degradation exceeds the rate of protein synthesis. In such situations, the body may go into negative ion balance.

=== Lipids ===
T_{3} stimulates the breakdown of cholesterol and increases the number of LDL receptors, thereby increasing the rate of lipolysis.

=== Heart ===
T_{3} increases the heart rate and force of contraction, thus increasing cardiac output, by increasing β-adrenergic receptor levels in myocardium. This results in increased systolic blood pressure and decreased diastolic blood pressure. The latter two effects act to produce the typical bounding pulse seen in hyperthyroidism. It also upregulates the thick filament protein myosin, which helps to increase contractility. A helpful clinical measure to assess contractility is the time between the QRS complex and the second heart sound. This is often decreased in hyperthyroidism.

=== Development ===
T_{3} has profound effect upon the developing embryo and infants. It affects the lungs and influences the postnatal growth of the central nervous system. It stimulates the production of myelin, the production of neurotransmitters, and the growth of axons. It is also important in the linear growth of bones.

=== Neurotransmitters ===
T_{3} may increase serotonin in the brain, in particular in the cerebral cortex, and down-regulate 5HT-2 receptors, based on studies in which T_{3} reversed learned helplessness in rats and physiological studies of the rat brain.

== Physiological function ==
Thyroid hormones act to increase protein turnover. This might serve an adaptive function in regard to long-term calorie restriction with adequate protein. When calories are in short supply, reduction in protein turnover may ameliorate the effects of the shortage.

== Measurement ==
Triiodothyronine can be measured as free triiodothyronine, which is an indicator of triiodothyronine activity in the body. It can also be measured as total triiodothyronine, which also depends on the triiodothyronine that is bound to thyroxine-binding globulin.

== Medical uses ==
T_{4} (levothyroxine) is almost always preferred over T_{3} (liothyronine) when treating hypothyroidism. Treatment with T_{3} alone is not recommended, as it causes increased and potentially unsafe blood levels of free T_{3} (FT_{3}). Combination treatment of hypothyroidism with T_{4} and T_{3} is generally only considered when treatment with T_{4} alone does not sufficiently resolve symptoms. As there is no evidence showing that combination treatment with T_{4} and T_{3} benefits patients, this approach is controversial, but it is supported by current guidelines of the European Thyroid Association and the British Thyroid Association for patients who do not respond at all to treatment with T_{4} alone.

=== Treatment of depressive disorders ===
The addition of triiodothyronine to existing treatments such as SSRIs is one of the most widely studied augmentation strategies for refractory depression, however success may depend on the dosage of T_{3}. A long-term case series study by Kelly and Lieberman of 17 patients with major refractory unipolar depression found that 14 patients showed sustained improvement of symptoms over an average timespan of two years, in some cases with higher doses of T_{3} than the traditional 50 μg required to achieve therapeutic effect, with an average of 80 μg and a dosage span of 24 months; dose range: 25–150 μg. The same authors published a retrospective study of 125 patients with the two most common categories of bipolar disorders II and NOS whose treatment had previously been resistant to an average of 14 other medications. They found that 84% experienced improvement and 33% experienced full remission over a period of an average of 20.3 months (standard deviation of 9.7). None of the patients experienced hypomania while on T_{3}.

=== Use as a fat loss supplement ===
3,3′-Diiodo-L-thyronine (3,3'-T_{2}) and 3,5-diiodo-L-thyronine (3,5-T_{2}) are used as ingredients in certain over-the-counter fat-loss supplements, designed for bodybuilding. Several studies have shown that these compounds increase the metabolization of fatty acids and the burning of adipose fat tissue in rats.

== Alternative medicine ==
Triiodothyronine has been used to treat Wilson's syndrome, an alternative medical diagnosis not recognized as a medical condition by mainstream medicine. This diagnosis involves various non-specific symptoms that are attributed to the thyroid, despite normal thyroid function tests. The American Thyroid Association has raised concern that the prescribed treatment with triiodothyronine is potentially harmful.

== History ==
In 1950, Jack Gross, a Canadian endocrinologist, came to the British National Institute for Medical Research to work with Rosalind Pitt-Rivers as a postdoctoral fellow. Gross had previous experience working at McGill University under Professor Charles Leblond, where they used radioactive iodine to study the physiology of thyroid hormone and applied chromatography to analyze radioiodinated proteins in human blood after radioiodine therapy. Gross and Leblond found an unknown radioactive compound in the blood of rats given radioactive iodine. The compound migrated close to thyroxine in chromatography and they initially named it 'unknown 1'. Around that time a group led by Jean Roche in Paris described a deiodinating activity in the sheep thyroid gland, raising the possibility that 'unknown 1' is the less iodinated analogue of T4, triiodothyronine. In March of 1952, Gross and Pitt-Rivers published a paper in The Lancet titled "The identification of 3: 5: 3'-L-triiodothyronine in human plasma".

While Gross & Pitt-Rivers are normally credited with discovering T_{3}, this compound was actually first isolated by the biochemists Hird and Trikojus at the University of Melbourne in 1948. It has been suggested that their published paper was little-known and therefore easily ignored. It has also been stated that Pitt-Rivers had read this paper but failed to mention it.

Between 2020 and 2024, in numerous studies, an association was observed between serum free triiodothyronine (fT3) concentrations and the prognosis of severe COVID-19 in patients with SARS-CoV-2 infection. Serum fT3 concentrations are significantly lower in patients with severe COVID-19 compared to those who are not severely ill, and they predict all-cause mortality in patients with severe COVID-19.

== See also ==
- Polar T_{3} syndrome
- TRC-150094
