= Thyroid hormones =

Hormones produced by the thyroid gland

The thyroid system of the thyroid hormones T_{3} and T_{4}

Thyroid hormones are two hormones produced and released by the thyroid gland: triiodothyronine (T_{3}) and thyroxine (T_{4}). They are tyrosine-based hormones that are primarily responsible for regulation of metabolism. T_{3} and T_{4} are partially composed of iodine, which is derived from food. A deficiency of iodine leads to decreased production of T_{3} and T_{4}, enlarges the thyroid tissue, and causes the disease known as simple goitre.

The major form of thyroid hormone in the blood is thyroxine (T_{4}), whose half-life of around one week is longer than that of T_{3}. In humans, the ratio of T_{4} to T_{3} released into the blood is approximately 14:1. T_{4} is converted to the active T_{3} (three to four times more potent than T_{4}) within cells by deiodinases (5′-deiodinase). These are further processed by decarboxylation and deiodination to produce iodothyronamine (T_{1}a) and thyronamine (T_{0}a). All three isoforms of the deiodinases are selenium-containing enzymes, thus dietary selenium is essential for T_{3} production. Calcitonin, a peptide hormone produced and secreted by the thyroid, is usually not included in the meaning of "thyroid hormone".

Thyroid hormones are one of the factors responsible for the modulation of energy expenditure. This is achieved through several mechanisms, such as mitochondrial biogenesis and adaptive thermogenesis.

American chemist Edward Calvin Kendall was responsible for the isolation of thyroxine in 1915. In 2020, levothyroxine, a manufactured form of thyroxine, was the second most commonly prescribed medication in the United States, with more than 98 million prescriptions. Levothyroxine is on the World Health Organization's List of Essential Medicines.

== Function ==
Thyroid hormones act on nearly every cell in the body. They act to increase the basal metabolic rate, affect protein synthesis, help regulate long bone growth (synergy with growth hormone) and neural maturation, and increase the body's sensitivity to catecholamines (such as norepinephrine and epinephrine) by permissiveness, especially under cold exposure. Thyroid hormones are essential to proper development and differentiation of all cells of the human body. These hormones also regulate protein, fat, and carbohydrate metabolism, affecting how human cells use energetic compounds. They also stimulate vitamin metabolism. Numerous physiological and pathological stimuli influence thyroid hormone synthesis.

Thyroid hormones lead to heat generation in humans. However, the thyronamines function via some unknown mechanism to inhibit neuronal activity; this plays an important role in the hibernation cycles of mammals and the moulting behaviour of birds. One effect of administering the thyronamines is a severe drop in body temperature.

== Medical use ==
Both T_{3} and T_{4} are used to treat thyroid hormone deficiency (hypothyroidism). They are both absorbed well by the stomach, so they can be given orally. Levothyroxine is the chemical name of the manufactured version of T_{4}, which is metabolised more slowly than T_{3} and hence usually needs only once-daily administration. Natural desiccated thyroid hormones are derived from pig thyroid glands, and are a "natural" hypothyroid treatment containing 20% T_{3} and traces of T_{2}, T_{1} and calcitonin.

Also available are synthetic combinations of T_{3}/T_{4} in different ratios (such as liotrix) and pure-T_{3} medications (INN: liothyronine). Levothyroxine sodium is usually the first course of treatment tried. Some patients report better outcomes with desiccated thyroid hormone; however, this is based on anecdotal evidence, and clinical trials have not shown any benefit over biosynthetic forms. Thyroid tablets are reported to have different effects, which can be attributed to the difference in torsional angles surrounding the reactive site of the molecule.

Thyronamines have no medical usages yet, though their use has been proposed for controlled induction of hypothermia, which causes the brain to enter a protective cycle and can be useful in preventing damage during ischemic shock. Synthetic thyroxine was first successfully produced by Charles Robert Harington and George Barger in 1926.

=== Formulations ===
Structure of (S)-thyroxine (T_{4})

(S)-triiodothyronine (T_{3}, also called liothyronine)

Most people are treated with levothyroxine, or a similar synthetic thyroid hormone. Different polymorphs of the compound have different solubilities and potencies. Additionally, natural thyroid hormone supplements from the dried thyroids of animals are available. Levothyroxine contains T_{4} only and is therefore largely ineffective for patients unable to convert T_{4} to T_{3}. These patients may choose to take natural thyroid hormone, as it contains a mixture of T_{4} and T_{3}, or alternatively supplement with a synthetic T_{3} treatment. In these cases, synthetic liothyronine is preferred due to the potential differences between the natural thyroid products. Some studies show that mixed therapy is beneficial to all patients, but the addition of liothyronine causes side effects, so the medication should be evaluated on an individual basis. These desiccated thyroid extract formulations predate the modern FDA drug approval process and have not undergone formal FDA review for safety and efficacy under current approval standards. Thyroid hormones are generally well tolerated. Thyroid hormones are usually not dangerous for pregnant women or nursing mothers, but should be given under a physician's supervision. In fact, if a pregnant woman with hypothyroidism is left untreated, her fetus is at a higher risk for congenital disabilities relative to the norm. When pregnant, a woman with a low-functioning thyroid will also need to increase her dosage of thyroid hormone. One exception is that thyroid hormones may aggravate heart conditions, especially in older patients; therefore, physicians may start these patients on a lower dose and work up to a larger one to avoid the risk of a heart attack.

== Thyroid metabolism ==
=== Central ===
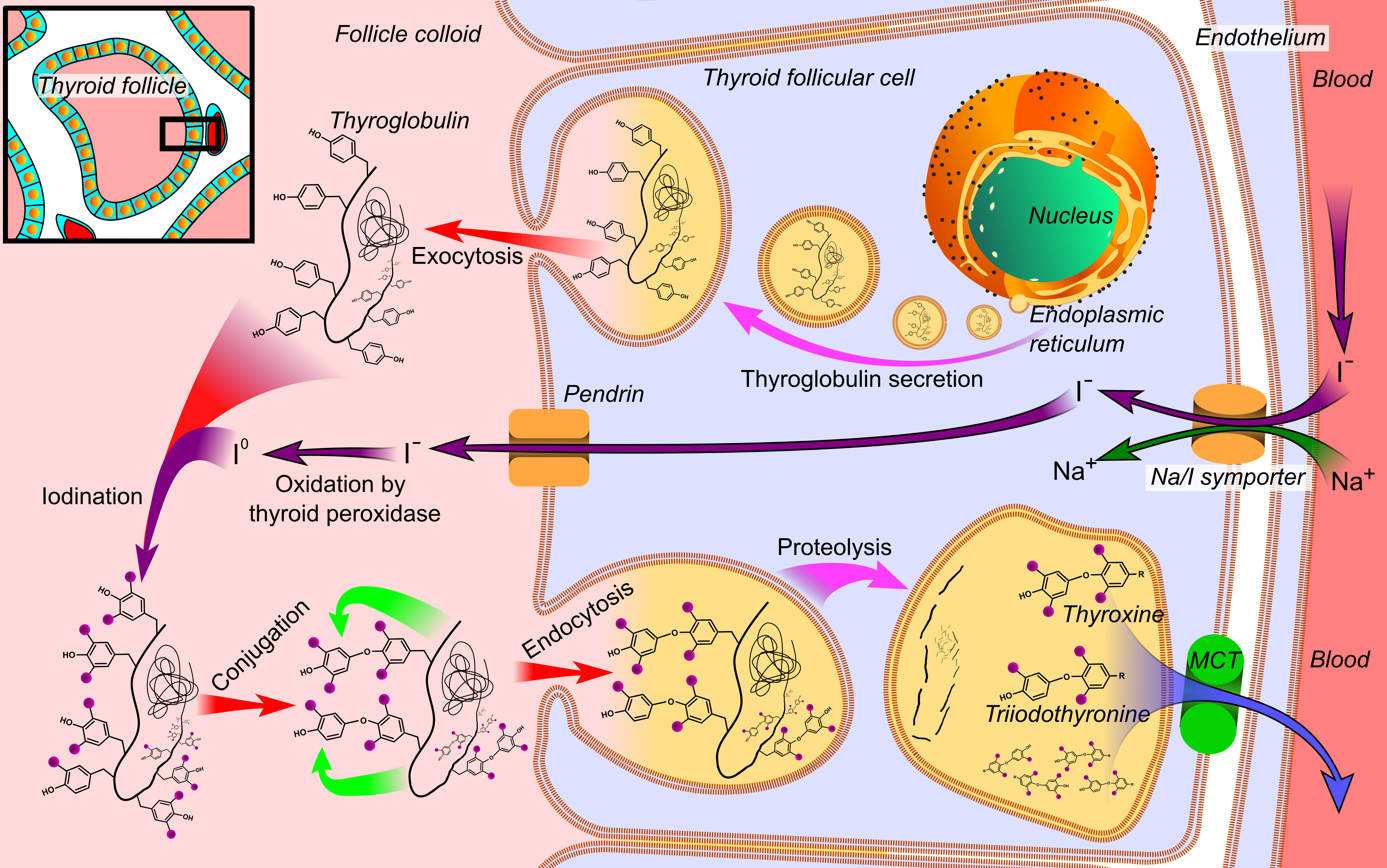
Synthesis of the thyroid hormones, as seen on an individual thyroid follicular cell: Thyroglobulin is synthesized in the rough endoplasmic reticulum and follows the secretory pathway to enter the colloid in the lumen of the thyroid follicle by exocytosis.; Meanwhile, a sodium-iodide (Na/I) symporter pumps iodide (I^{−}) actively into the cell, which previously has crossed the endothelium by largely unknown mechanisms.; This iodide enters the follicular lumen from the cytoplasm by the transporter pendrin, in a purportedly passive manner.; In the colloid, iodide (I^{−}) is oxidized to iodine (I^{0}) by an enzyme called thyroid peroxidase.; Iodine (I^{0}) is very reactive and iodinates the thyroglobulin at tyrosyl residues in its protein chain (in total containing approximately 120 tyrosyl residues).; In conjugation, adjacent tyrosyl residues are paired together.; Thyroglobulin re-enters the follicular cell by endocytosis.; Proteolysis by various proteases liberates thyroxine and triiodothyronine molecules; Efflux of thyroxine and triiodothyronine from follicular cells, which appears to be largely through monocarboxylate transporter 8 (MCT 8) and 10, and entry into the blood.

Thyroid hormones (T_{4} and T_{3}) are produced by thyroid epithelial cells (a.k.a. thyroid follicular cells) and are regulated by thyroid-stimulating hormone (TSH) made by the thyrotropes of the anterior pituitary gland. The effects of T_{4} in vivo are mediated via T_{3} (T_{4} is converted to T_{3} in target tissues). T_{3} is three to five times more active than T_{4}. T_{4}, thyroxine (3,5,3′,5′-tetraiodothyronine), is produced by follicular cells of the thyroid gland. It is produced from the precursor thyroglobulin (this is not the same as thyroxine-binding globulin [TBG]), which is cleaved by enzymes to produce active T_{4}.

The steps in this process are as follows:

1. The Na^{+}/I^{−} symporter transports two sodium ions across the basement membrane of the follicular cells along with an iodide ion. This is a secondary active transporter that utilises the concentration gradient of Na^{+} to move I^{−} against its concentration gradient. This is called iodide trapping. Sodium is cotransported with iodide from the basolateral side of the membrane into the cell, and then concentrated in the thyroid follicles to about thirty times its concentration in the blood.
2. I^{−} is moved across the apical membrane into the colloid of the follicle by pendrin. Hydrogen peroxide is also introduced into the follicle by the action of DUX (Dual Oxidase).
3. Iodide is non-reactive, and the reactive I2 species is required for the next step. Thyroid peroxidase (TPO) reduces hydrogen peroxide to water by transferring one electron from two I^{−} atoms that react to form I_{2}.
4. Iodine (I2) is converted into HOI, by hydration with water. Both I2 and HOI iodinate specific tyrosyl residues of the thyroglobulin within the colloid to form 3-monoiodityrosyl (MIT-yl) and 3,5-diiodityrosyl (DIT-yl) residues—introducting iodine atoms at one or both locations ortho to the hydroxyls of tyrosine. The thyroglobulin was synthesised in the ER of the follicular cell and secreted into the colloid.
5. TPO also converts tyrosyl, MIT-yl, and DIT-yl residues into their free radical forms. These forms attack other MIT-yl and DIT-yl residues. When a DIT-yl radical attacks a DIT, T_{4}-yl (peptidic T_{4}) is formed. When a MIT-yl radical attacks a DIT, T_{3}-yl is formed. Other reactions are possible, but do not form physiologically active products.
6. Iodinated thyroglobulin binds megalin for endocytosis back into the cell.
7. TSH released from the anterior pituitary (a.k.a. the adenohypophysis) binds the TSH receptor (a G_{s} protein-coupled receptor) on the basolateral membrane of the cell and stimulates the endocytosis of the colloid.
8. The endocytosed vesicles fuse with the lysosomes of the follicular cell. The lysosomal enzymes cleave any MIT, DIT, T_{3}, T_{4} as well as the inactive analogues from the iodinated thyroglobulin.
9. The thyroid hormones cross the follicular cell membrane towards the blood vessels by an unknown mechanism. Textbooks have stated that diffusion is the main means of transport, but recent studies indicate that monocarboxylate transporter 8 (MCT 8) and 10 play major roles in the efflux of the thyroid hormones from thyroid cells.

Thyroglobulin (Tg) is a 660 kDa, dimeric protein produced by the follicular cells of the thyroid and used entirely within the thyroid gland. Thyroxine is produced by attaching iodine atoms to the ring structures of this protein's tyrosine residues; thyroxine (T_{4}) contains four iodine atoms, while triiodothyronine (T_{3}), otherwise identical to T_{4}, has one less iodine atom per molecule. The thyroglobulin protein accounts for approximately half of the protein content of the thyroid gland. Each thyroglobulin molecule contains approximately 100–120 tyrosine residues, a small number (<20) of which are subject to iodination catalysed by thyroperoxidase. The same enzyme then catalyses "coupling" of one modified tyrosine with another, via a free-radical-mediated reaction, and when these iodinated bicyclic molecules are released by hydrolysis of the protein, T_{3} and T_{4} are the result. Therefore, each thyroglobulin protein molecule ultimately yields very small amounts of thyroid hormone (experimentally observed to be on the order of 5–6 molecules of either T_{4} or T_{3} per original molecule of thyroglobulin).

Hydrolysis (cleavage to individual amino acids) of the modified protein by proteases then liberates T_{3} and T_{4}, as well as the non-coupled tyrosine derivatives MIT and DIT. The hormones T_{4} and T_{3} are the biologically active agents central to metabolic regulation.

=== Peripheral ===
Thyroxine is believed to be a prohormone and a reservoir for the most active and main thyroid hormone, T_{3}. T_{4} is converted as required in the tissues by iodothyronine deiodinase. Deficiency of deiodinase can mimic hypothyroidism due to iodine deficiency. T_{3} is more active than T_{4}, though it is present in less quantity than T_{4}.

=== Initiation of production in fetuses ===
Thyrotropin-releasing hormone (TRH) is released from hypothalamus by 6–8 gestational weeks, and thyroid-stimulating hormone (TSH) secretion from the fetal pituitary gland is evident by 12 gestational weeks; fetal production of thyroxine (T_{4}) reaches a clinically significant level at 18–20 weeks. Fetal triiodothyronine (T_{3}) remains low (less than 15 ng/dL) until 30 weeks of gestation, and increases to 50 ng/dL at term. Fetal self-sufficiency of thyroid hormones protects the fetus against, for example, neurodevelopmental abnormalities caused by maternal hypothyroidism.

=== Iodine deficiency ===
Among humans with dietary iodine deficiency, the thyroid will not be able to make thyroid hormones. The lack of thyroid hormones will lead to decreased negative feedback on the pituitary gland, leading to increased production of thyroid-stimulating hormone, which causes the thyroid to enlarge in a medical condition called endemic colloid goitre. This has the effect of increasing the thyroid's ability to trap more iodide, compensating for the iodine deficiency and allowing it to produce adequate amounts of thyroid hormone.

== Circulation and transport ==
=== Plasma transport ===
Most of the thyroid hormone circulating in the blood is bound to transport proteins, and only a very small fraction is unbound and biologically active. Therefore, measuring concentrations of free thyroid hormones is important for diagnosis, while measuring total levels can be misleading.

Thyroid hormone in the blood is usually distributed as follows:

Type	Percent
bound to thyroxine-binding globulin (TBG)	70%
bound to transthyretin or "thyroxine-binding prealbumin" (TTR or TBPA)	10–15%
albumin	15–20%
unbound T_{4} (fT_{4})	0.03%
unbound T_{3} (fT_{3})	0.3%

Despite being lipophilic, T_{3} and T_{4} cross the cell membrane via carrier-mediated transport, which is ATP-dependent.

T_{1}a and T_{0}a are positively charged and do not cross the membrane; they are believed to function via the trace amine-associated receptor TAAR1 (TAR1, TA1), a G-protein-coupled receptor located in the cytoplasm.

Another critical diagnostic tool is measurement of the amount of thyroid-stimulating hormone (TSH) that is present.

=== Membrane transport ===
Contrary to common belief, thyroid hormones cannot traverse cell membranes in a passive manner like other lipophilic substances. The iodine in o-position makes the phenolic OH-group more acidic, resulting in a negative charge at physiological pH. However, at least 10 different active, energy-dependent and genetically regulated iodothyronine transporters have been identified in humans. They guarantee that intracellular levels of thyroid hormones are higher than in blood plasma or interstitial fluids.

=== Intracellular transport ===
Little is known about intracellular kinetics of thyroid hormones. However, recently it could be demonstrated that the crystallin CRYM binds 3,5,3′-triiodothyronine in vivo.

== Mechanism of action ==
The thyroid hormones function via a well-studied set of nuclear receptors, termed the thyroid hormone receptors. These receptors, together with corepressor molecules, bind DNA regions called thyroid hormone response elements (TREs) near genes. This receptor-corepressor-DNA complex can block gene transcription. Triiodothyronine (T_{3}), which is the active form of thyroxine (T_{4}), goes on to bind to receptors. The deiodinase catalyzed reaction removes an iodine atom from the 5′ position of the outer aromatic ring of thyroxine's (T_{4}) structure. When triiodothyronine (T_{3}) binds a receptor, it induces a conformational change in the receptor, displacing the corepressor from the complex. This leads to recruitment of coactivator proteins and RNA polymerase, activating transcription of the gene. Although this general functional model has considerable experimental support, there remain many open questions.

More recently genetic evidence has been obtained for a second mechanism of thyroid hormone action involving one of the same nuclear receptors, TRβ, acting rapidly in the cytoplasm through the PI3K. This mechanism is conserved in all mammals but not fish or amphibians, and regulates brain development and adult metabolism. The mechanism itself parallels the actions of the nuclear receptor in the nucleus: in the absence of hormone, TRβ binds to PI3K and inhibits its activity, but when hormone binds the complex dissociates, PI3K activity increases, and the hormone bound receptor diffuses into the nucleus.

=== Thyroxine, iodine and apoptosis ===
Thyroxine and iodine stimulate the apoptosis of the cells of the larval gills, tail and fins in amphibian metamorphosis, and stimulate the evolution of their nervous system transforming the aquatic, vegetarian tadpole into the terrestrial, carnivorous frog. In fact, amphibian frog Xenopus laevis serves as an ideal model system for the study of the mechanisms of apoptosis.

=== Effects of triiodothyronine ===
Effects of triiodothyronine (T_{3}) which is the metabolically active form:

- Increases cardiac output
- Increases heart rate
- Increases ventilation rate
- Increases basal metabolic rate
- Potentiates the effects of catecholamines (i.e. increases sympathetic activity)
- Potentiates brain development
- Thickens endometrium in females
- Increases catabolism of proteins and carbohydrates

== Measurement ==
Further information: Thyroid function tests

Triiodothyronine (T_{3}) and thyroxine (T_{4}) can be measured as free T_{3} and free T_{4}, which are indicators of their activities in the body. They can also be measured as total T_{3} and total T_{4}, which depend on the amount that is bound to thyroxine-binding globulin (TBG). A related parameter is the free thyroxine index, which is total T_{4} multiplied by thyroid hormone uptake, which, in turn, is a measure of the unbound TBG. Additionally, thyroid disorders can be detected prenatally using advanced imaging techniques and testing fetal hormone levels.

== Related diseases ==
Both excess and deficiency of thyroxine can cause disorders.

- Hyperthyroidism (an example is Graves' disease) is the clinical syndrome caused by an excess of circulating free thyroxine, free triiodothyronine, or both. It is a common disorder that affects approximately 2% of women and 0.2% of men. Thyrotoxicosis is often used interchangeably with hyperthyroidism, but there are subtle differences. Although thyrotoxicosis also refers to an increase in circulating thyroid hormones, it can be caused by the intake of thyroxine tablets or by an over-active thyroid, whereas hyperthyroidism refers solely to an over-active thyroid.
- Hypothyroidism (an example is Hashimoto's thyroiditis) is the case where there is a deficiency of thyroxine, triiodothyronine, or both.
- Clinical depression can sometimes be caused by hypothyroidism, whereas bipolar disorder can sometimes be caused by hyperthyroidism. Some research has shown that T_{3} is found in the junctions of synapses, and regulates the amounts and activity of serotonin, norepinephrine, and γ-aminobutyric acid (GABA) in the brain.
- Hair loss can sometimes be attributed to a malfunction of T_{3} and T_{4}. Normal hair growth cycle may be affected disrupting the hair growth.
- Both thyroid excess and deficiency can cause cardiovascular disorders or make preexisting conditions worse. The link between excess and deficiency of thyroid hormone on conditions like arrhythmias, heart failure, and atherosclerotic vascular diseases, have been established for nearly 200 years.
- Abnormal thyroid function—hypo- and hyperthyroidism—can manifest as myopathy with symptoms of exercise-induced muscle fatigue, cramping, muscle pain and may include proximal weakness or muscle hypertrophy (particularly of the calves). Prolonged hypo- and hyperthyroid myopathy leads to atrophy of type II (fast-twitch/glycolytic) muscle fibres, and a predominance of type I (slow-twitch/oxidative) muscle fibres. Muscle biopsy shows abnormal muscle glycogen: high accumulation in hypothyroidism and low accumulation in hyperthyroidism. Myopathy associated with hypothyroidism includes Kocher-Debre-Semelaigne syndrome (childhood-onset), Hoffman syndrome (adult-onset), myasthenic syndrome, and atrophic form. Myopathy associated with hyperthyroidism includes thyrotoxic myopathy, thyrotoxic periodic paralysis, and Graves' ophthalmopathy. In Graves' ophthalmopathy, the proptosis is secondary to extraocular muscle (EOM) enlargement and gross expansion of orbital fat.

Preterm births can suffer neurodevelopmental disorders due to lack of maternal thyroid hormones, at a time when their own thyroid is unable to meet their postnatal needs. Also in normal pregnancies, adequate levels of maternal thyroid hormone are vital in order to ensure thyroid hormone availability for the foetus and its developing brain. Congenital hypothyroidism occurs in every 1 in 1600–3400 newborns with most being born asymptomatic and developing related symptoms weeks after birth.

== Anti-thyroid drugs ==
Iodine uptake against a concentration gradient is mediated by a sodium–iodine symporter and is linked to a sodium-potassium ATPase. Perchlorate and thiocyanate are drugs that can compete with iodine at this point. Compounds such as goitrin, carbimazole, methimazole, propylthiouracil can reduce thyroid hormone production by interfering with iodine oxidation.
