= Thyroid disease =

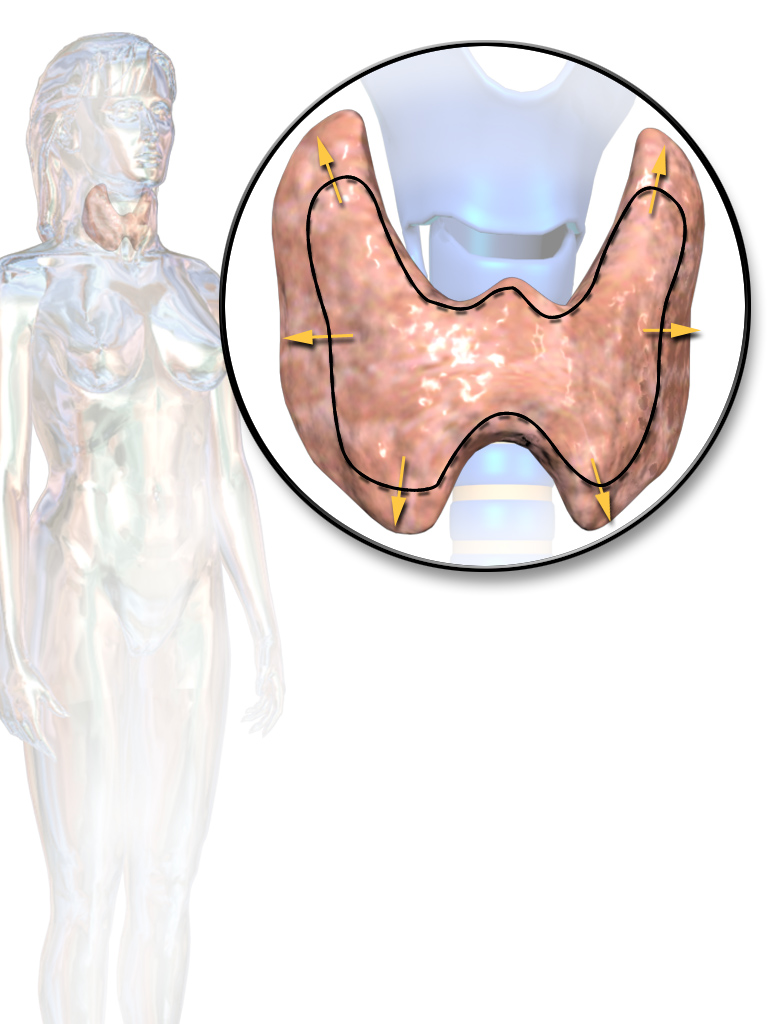
- An illustration of goiter, a type of thyroid disease
- Specialty: Endocrinology, medical genetics

Thyroid disease is a medical condition that affects the structure or function of the thyroid gland. The thyroid gland is located at the front of the neck and produces thyroid hormones that travel through the blood to help regulate many other organs, meaning that it is an endocrine organ. These hormones normally act in the body to regulate energy use, infant development, and childhood development.

There are five general types of thyroid disease, each with their own symptoms. A person may have one or several different types at the same time. The five groups are:

1. Hypothyroidism (low function) caused by not having enough free thyroid hormones
2. Hyperthyroidism (high function) caused by having too many free thyroid hormones
3. Structural abnormalities, most commonly a goiter (enlargement of the thyroid gland)
4. Tumors which can be benign (not cancerous) or cancerous
5. Abnormal thyroid function tests without any clinical symptoms (subclinical hypothyroidism or subclinical hyperthyroidism).

In the US, hypothyroidism and hyperthyroidism were respectively found in 4.6 and 1.3% of the >12y old population (2002).

In some types, such as subacute thyroiditis or postpartum thyroiditis, symptoms may go away after a few months and laboratory tests may return to normal. However, most types of thyroid disease do not resolve on their own. Common hypothyroid symptoms include fatigue, low energy, weight gain, inability to tolerate the cold, slow heart rate, dry skin and constipation. Common hyperthyroid symptoms include irritability, anxiety, weight loss, fast heartbeat, inability to tolerate the heat, diarrhea, and enlargement of the thyroid. Structural abnormalities may not produce symptoms; however, some people may have hyperthyroid or hypothyroid symptoms related to the structural abnormality or notice swelling of the neck. Rarely goiters can cause compression of the airway, compression of the vessels in the neck, or difficulty swallowing. Tumors, often called thyroid nodules, can also have many different symptoms ranging from hyperthyroidism to hypothyroidism to swelling in the neck and compression of the structures in the neck.

Diagnosis starts with a history and physical examination. Screening for thyroid disease in patients without symptoms is a debated topic although commonly practiced in the United States. If dysfunction of the thyroid is suspected, laboratory tests can help support or rule out thyroid disease. Initial blood tests often include thyroid-stimulating hormone (TSH) and free thyroxine (T4). Total and free triiodothyronine (T3) levels are less commonly used. If autoimmune disease of the thyroid is suspected, blood tests looking for Anti-thyroid autoantibodies can also be obtained. Procedures such as ultrasound, biopsy and a radioiodine scanning and uptake study may also be used to help with the diagnosis, particularly if a nodule is suspected.

Thyroid diseases are highly prevalent worldwide, and treatment varies based on the disorder. Levothyroxine is the mainstay of treatment for people with hypothyroidism, while people with hyperthyroidism caused by Graves' disease can be managed with iodine therapy, antithyroid medication, or surgical removal of the thyroid gland. Thyroid surgery may also be performed to remove a thyroid nodule or to reduce the size of a goiter if it obstructs nearby structures or for cosmetic reasons.

== Signs and symptoms ==
Symptoms of the condition vary with type: hypo- vs. hyperthyroidism, which are further described below.

Possible symptoms of hypothyroidism are:

- Tiredness
- Unexplained weight gain
- Slow movement
- Muscle cramps
- Slow heart rate (bradycardia)
- Sensitivity to cold temperatures
- Constipation
- Depressed mood
- Memory difficulty

Possible symptoms of hyperthyroidism are:

- Difficulty sleeping (insomnia)
- Unexplained weight loss
- Tremors
- Fast heart rate (tachycardia) or palpitations
- Sensitivity to hot temperatures, excess sweating
- Diarrhea
- Anxiety, irritability

Note: certain symptoms and physical changes can be seen in both hypothyroidism and hyperthyroidism —fatigue, fine / thinning hair, menstrual cycle irregularities, muscle weakness / aches (myalgia), and different forms of myxedema.

== Diseases ==
=== Low function ===
Hypothyroidism is a state in which the body is not producing enough thyroid hormones, or is not able to respond to / utilize existing thyroid hormones properly. The main categories are:

- Thyroiditis: an inflammation of the thyroid gland
  - Hashimoto's thyroiditis / Hashimoto's disease
  - Ord's thyroiditis
  - Postpartum thyroiditis
  - Silent thyroiditis
  - Acute thyroiditis
  - Riedel's thyroiditis (the majority of cases do not affect thyroid function, but approximately 30% of cases lead to hypothyroidism)
- Iatrogenic hypothyroidism
  - Postoperative hypothyroidism
  - Medication- or radiation-induced hypothyroidism
- Thyroid hormone resistance
- Euthyroid sick syndrome
- Congenital hypothyroidism: a deficiency of thyroid hormone from birth, which untreated can lead to cretinism

=== High function ===
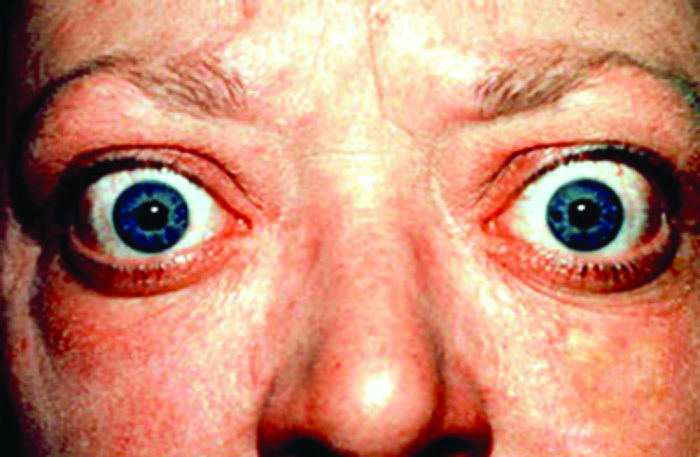
Exophthalmos is the eye bulging that may be seen with Graves Disease, one of the major causes of hyperthyroidism

Hyperthyroidism is a state in which the body is producing too much thyroid hormone. The main hyperthyroid conditions are:

- Graves' disease
- Toxic thyroid nodule
- Thyroid storm
- Toxic nodular struma (Plummer's disease)
- Hashitoxicosis: transient hyperthyroidism that can occur in Hashimoto's thyroiditis

=== Structural abnormalities ===
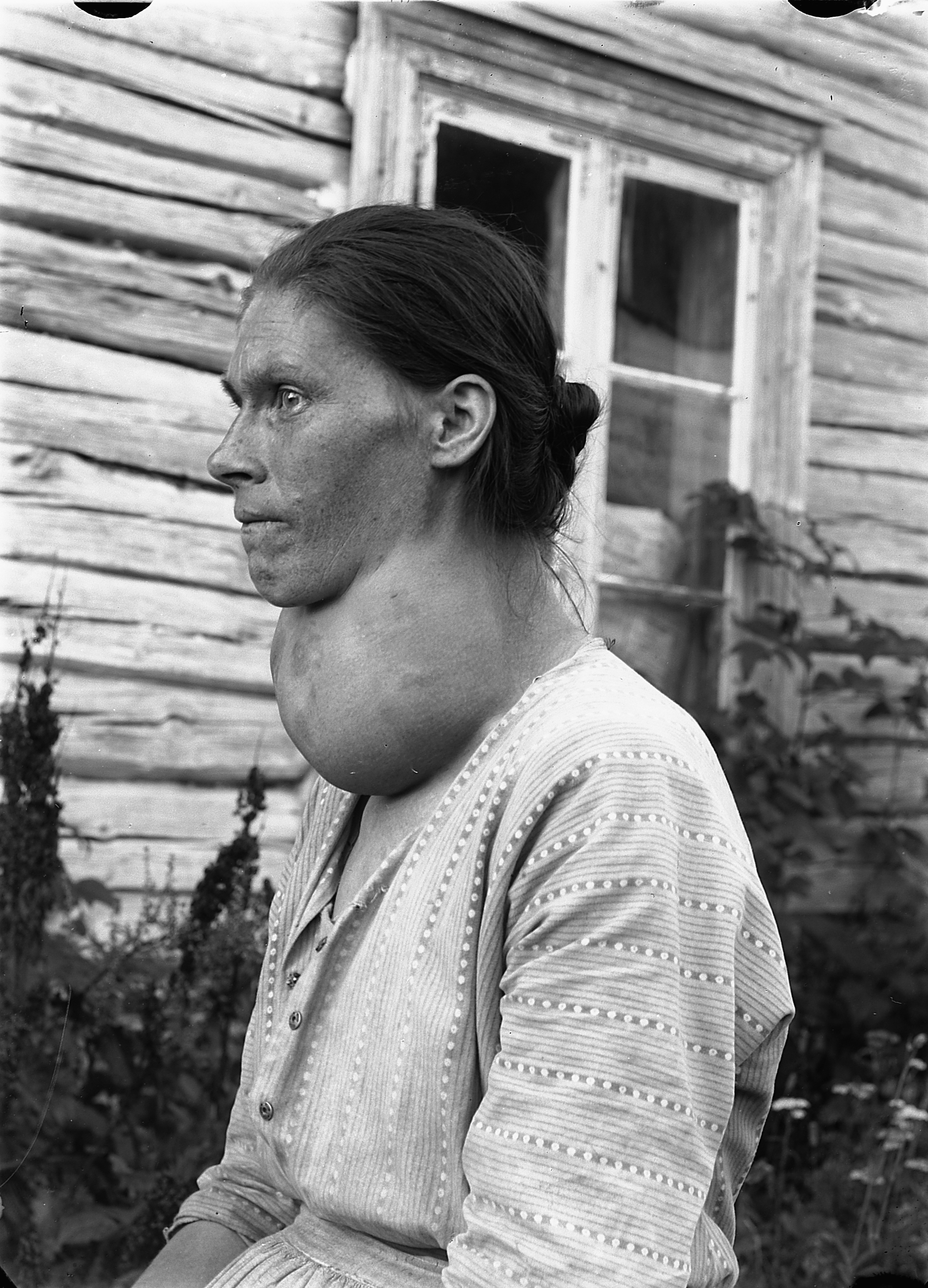
Endemic goiter

- Goiter: an abnormal enlargement of the thyroid gland
  - Endemic goiter
  - Diffuse goiter
  - Multinodular goiter
- Lingual thyroid
- Thyroglossal duct cyst

=== Tumors ===
- Thyroid cancer
  - Papillary
  - Follicular
  - Medullary
  - Anaplastic
- Lymphomas are usually malignant
- Thyroid adenomas are benign tumors

=== Medication side effects ===
Certain medications can have the unintended side effect of affecting thyroid function. While some medications can lead to significant hypothyroidism or hyperthyroidism and those at risk will need to be carefully monitored, some medications may affect thyroid hormone lab tests without causing any symptoms or clinical changes, and may not require treatment. The following medications have been linked to various forms of thyroid disease:

- Amiodarone (more commonly can lead to hypothyroidism, but can be associated with some types of hyperthyroidism)
- Lithium salts (hypothyroidism)
- Some types of interferon and IL-2 (thyroiditis)
- Glucocorticoids, dopamine agonists, and somatostatin analogs (block TSH, which can lead to hypothyroidism)

== Pathophysiology ==
Most thyroid disease in the United States stems from a condition where the body's immune system attacks itself. In other instances, thyroid disease comes from the body trying to adapt to environmental conditions like iodine deficiency or to new physiologic conditions like pregnancy.

== Autoimmune thyroid disease ==
Autoimmune thyroid disease is a general category of disease that occurs due to the immune system targeting its own body. It is not fully understood why this occurs, but it is thought to be partially genetic as these diseases tend to run in families. In one of the most common types, Graves' Disease, the body produces antibodies against the TSH receptor on thyroid cells. This causes the receptor to activate even without TSH being present and causes the thyroid to produce and release excess thyroid hormone (hyperthyroidism). Another common form of autoimmune thyroid disease is Hashimoto's thyroiditis where the body produces antibodies against different normal components of the thyroid gland, most commonly thyroglobulin, thyroid peroxidase, and the TSH receptor. These antibodies cause the immune system to attack the thyroid cells and cause inflammation (lymphocytic infiltration) and destruction (fibrosis) of the gland.

=== Goiter ===
Goiter is the general enlargement of the thyroid that can be associated with many thyroid diseases. The main reason this happens is because of increased signaling to the thyroid by way of TSH receptors to try to make it produce more thyroid hormone. This causes increased vascularity and increase in size (hypertrophy) of the gland. In hypothyroid states or iodine deficiency, the body recognizes that it is not producing enough thyroid hormone and starts to produce more TSH to help stimulate the thyroid to produce more thyroid hormone. This stimulation causes the gland to increase in size to increase production of thyroid hormone. In hyperthyroidism caused by Graves' Disease or toxic multinodular goiter, there is excess stimulation of the TSH receptor even when thyroid hormone levels are normal. In Graves' Disease this is because of an autoantibodies (Thyroid Stimulating Immunoglobulins) which bind to and activate the TSH receptors in place of TSH while in toxic multinodular goiter this is often because of a mutation in the TSH receptor that causes it to activate without receiving a signal from TSH. In more rare cases, the thyroid may become enlarged because it becomes filled with thyroid hormone or thyroid hormone precursors that it is unable to release or because of congenital abnormalities or because of increased intake of iodine from supplementation or medication.

=== Pregnancy ===
There are many changes to the body during pregnancy. One of the major changes to help with the development of the fetus is the production of human chorionic gonadotropin (hCG). This hormone, produced by the placenta, has similar structure to TSH and can bind to the maternal TSH receptor to produce thyroid hormone. During pregnancy, there is also an increase in estrogen which causes the mother to produce more thyroxine binding globulin, which is what carries most of the thyroid hormone in the blood. These normal hormonal changes often make pregnancy look like a hyperthyroid state but may be within the normal range for pregnancy, so it necessary to use trimester specific ranges for TSH and free T4. True hyperthyroidism in pregnancy is most often caused by an autoimmune mechanism from Graves' Disease. New diagnosis of hypothyroidism in pregnancy is rare because hypothyroidism often makes it difficult to become pregnant in the first place. When hypothyroidism is seen in pregnancy, it is often because an individual already has hypothyroidism and needs to increase their levothyroxine dose to account for the increased thyroxine binding globulin present in pregnancy.

== Diagnosis ==
Diagnosis of thyroid disease depends on symptoms and whether or not a thyroid nodule is present. Most patients will receive a blood test. Others might need an ultrasound, biopsy or a radioiodine scanning and uptake study.

=== Blood tests ===
Overview of the thyroid system and the various hormones involved.

==== Thyroid function tests ====
There are several hormones that can be measured in the blood to determine how the thyroid gland is functioning. These include the thyroid hormones triiodothyronine (T3) and its precursor thyroxine (T4), which are produced by the thyroid gland. Thyroid-stimulating hormone (TSH) is another important hormone that is secreted by the anterior pituitary cells in the brain. Its primary function is to increase the production of T3 and T4 by the thyroid gland.

The most useful marker of thyroid gland function is serum thyroid-stimulating hormone (TSH) levels. TSH levels are determined by a classic negative feedback system in which high levels of T3 and T4 suppress the production of TSH, and low levels of T3 and T4 increase the production of TSH. TSH levels are thus often used by doctors as a screening test, where the first approach is to determine whether TSH is elevated, suppressed, or normal.

- Elevated TSH levels can signify inadequate thyroid hormone production (hypothyroidism)
- Suppressed TSH levels can point to excessive thyroid hormone production (hyperthyroidism)

Because a single abnormal TSH level can be misleading, T3 and T4 levels must be measured in the blood to further confirm the diagnosis. When circulating in the body, T3 and T4 are bound to transport proteins. Only a small fraction of the circulating thyroid hormones are unbound or free, and thus biologically active. T3 and T4 levels can thus be measured as free T3 and T4, or total T3 and T4, which takes into consideration the free hormones in addition to the protein-bound hormones. Free T3 and T4 measurements are important because certain drugs and illnesses can affect the concentrations of transport proteins, resulting in differing total and free thyroid hormone levels. There are differing guidelines for T3 and T4 measurements.

- Free T4 levels should be measured in the evaluation of hypothyroidism, and low free T4 establishes the diagnosis. T3 levels are generally not measured in the evaluation of hypothyroidism.
- Free T4 and total T3 can be measured when hyperthyroidism is of high suspicion as it will improve the accuracy of the diagnosis. Free T4, total T3 or both are elevated and serum TSH is below normal in hyperthyroidism. If the hyperthyroidism is mild, only serum T3 may be elevated and serum TSH can be low or may not be detected in the blood.
- Free T4 levels may also be tested in patients who have convincing symptoms of hyper- and hypothyroidism, despite a normal TSH.

==== Antithyroid antibodies ====
Autoantibodies to the thyroid gland may be detected in various disease states. There are several anti-thyroid antibodies, including anti-thyroglobulin antibodies (TgAb), anti-microsomal/anti-thyroid peroxidase antibodies (TPOAb), and TSH receptor antibodies (TSHRAb).

- Elevated anti-thryoglobulin (TgAb) and anti-thyroid peroxidase antibodies (TPOAb) can be found in patients with Hashimoto's thyroiditis, the most common autoimmune type of hypothyroidism. TPOAb levels have also been found to be elevated in patients who present with subclinical hypothyroidism (where TSH is elevated, but free T4 is normal), and can help predict progression to overt hypothyroidism. The American Association Thyroid Association thus recommends measuring TPOAb levels when evaluating subclinical hypothyroidism or when trying to identify whether nodular thyroid disease is due to autoimmune thyroid disease.
- When the etiology of hyperthyroidism is not clear after initial clinical and biochemical evaluation, measurement of TSH receptor antibodies (TSHRAb) can help make the diagnosis. In Graves' disease, TSHRAb levels are elevated as they are responsible for activating the TSH receptor and causing increased thyroid hormone production.

==== Other markers ====
- There are two markers for thyroid-derived cancers.
  - Thyroglobulin (TG) levels can be elevated in well-differentiated papillary or follicular adenocarcinoma. It is often used to provide information on residual, recurrent or metastatic disease in patients with differentiated thyroid cancer. However, serum TG levels can be elevated in most thyroid diseases. Routine measurement of serum TG for evaluation of thyroid nodules is therefore currently not recommended by the American Thyroid Association.
  - Elevated calcitonin levels in the blood have been shown to be associated with the rare medullary thyroid cancer. However, the measurement of calcitonin levels as a diagnostic tool is currently controversial due to falsely high or low calcitonin levels in a variety of diseases other than medullary thyroid cancer.
- Very infrequently, TBG and transthyretin levels may be abnormal; these are not routinely tested.
- To differentiate between different types of hypothyroidism, a specific test may be used. Thyrotropin-releasing hormone (TRH) is injected into the body through a vein. This hormone is naturally secreted by the hypothalamus and stimulates the pituitary gland. The pituitary responds by releasing thyroid-stimulating hormone (TSH). Large amounts of externally administered TRH can suppress the subsequent release of TSH. This amount of release-suppression is exaggerated in primary hypothyroidism, major depression, cocaine dependence, amphetamine dependence and chronic phencyclidine abuse. There is a failure to suppress in the manic phase of bipolar disorder.

=== Ultrasound ===
Many people may develop a thyroid nodule at some point in their lives. Although many who experience this worry that it is thyroid cancer, there are many causes of nodules that are benign and not cancerous. If a possible nodule is present, a doctor may order thyroid function tests to determine if the thyroid gland's activity is being affected. If more information is needed after a clinical exam and lab tests, medical ultrasonography can help determine the nature of thyroid nodule(s). There are some notable differences in typical benign vs. cancerous thyroid nodules that can particularly be detected by the high-frequency sound waves in an ultrasound scan. The ultrasound may also locate nodules that are too small for a doctor to feel on a physical exam, and can demonstrate whether a nodule is primarily solid, liquid (cystic), or a mixture of both. It is an imaging process that can often be done in a doctor's office, is painless, and does not expose the individual to any radiation.

The main characteristics that can help distinguish a benign vs. malignant (cancerous) thyroid nodule on ultrasound are as follows:

Possible thyroid cancer	More likely benign
irregular borders	smooth borders
hypoechoic (less echogenic than the surrounding tissue)	hyperechoic
incomplete "halo"	spongiform appearance
significant intranodular / central blood flow by power Doppler	marked peripheral blood flow
microcalcifications	larger, broad calcifications (note: these can be seen in medullary thyroid cancer)
nodule appears more tall than wide on transverse study	"comet tail" artifact as sound waves bounce off intranodular colloid
documented progressive increase in size of nodule on ultrasound	

Although ultrasonography is a very important diagnostic tool, this method is not always able to separate benign from malignant nodules with certainty. In suspicious cases, a tissue sample is often obtained by biopsy for microscopic examination.

=== Radioiodine scanning and uptake ===
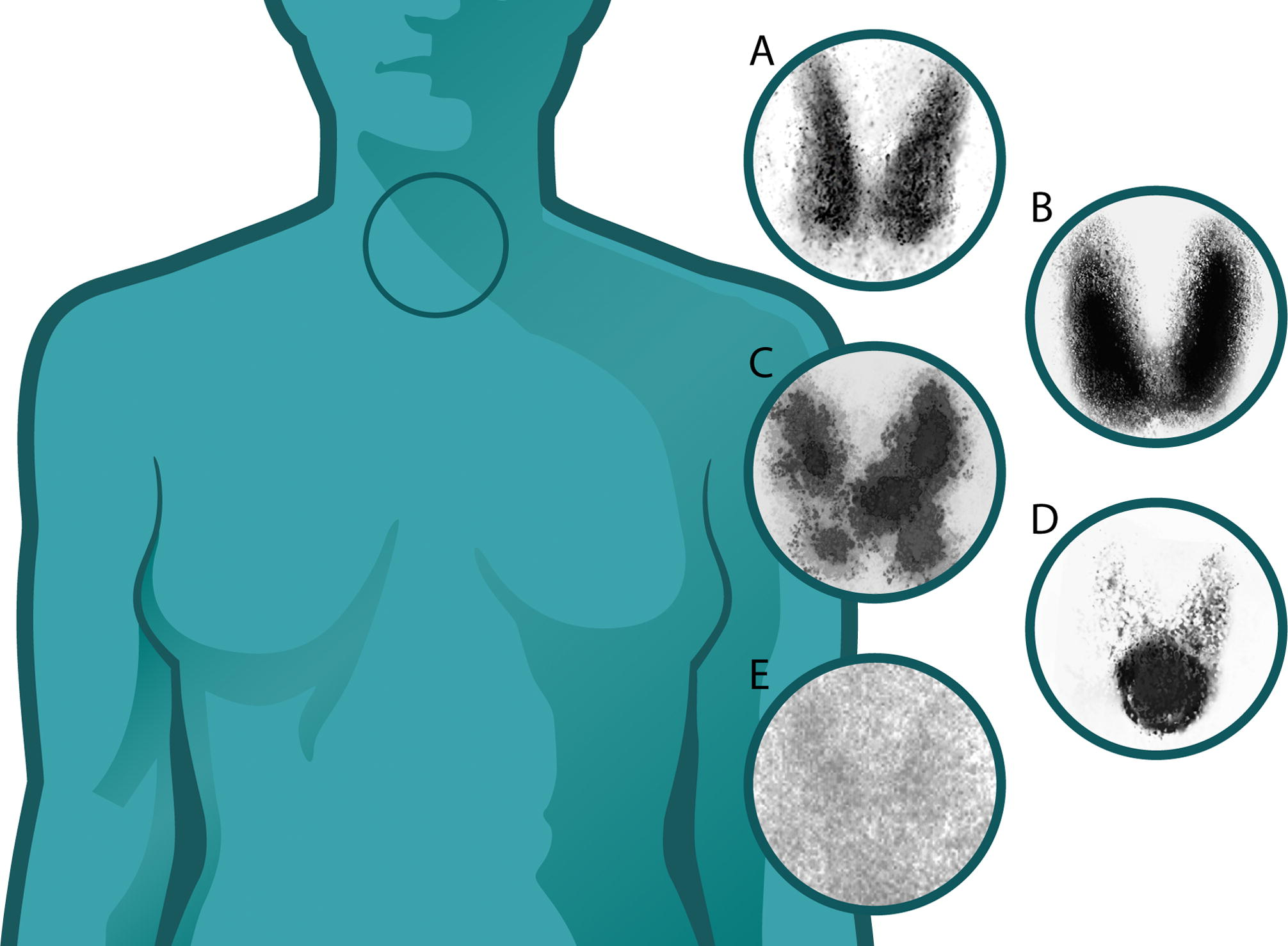
Five scintigrams taken from thyroids with different syndromes: A) normal thyroid, B) Graves' disease, diffuse increased uptake in both thyroid lobes, C) Plummer's disease, D) Toxic adenoma, E) Thyroiditis.

Thyroid scintigraphy, in which the thyroid is imaged with the aid of radioactive iodine (usually iodine-123, which does not harm thyroid cells, or rarely, iodine-131), is performed in the nuclear medicine department of a hospital or clinic. Radioiodine collects in the thyroid gland before being excreted in the urine. While in the thyroid, the radioactive emissions can be detected by a camera, producing a rough image of the shape (a radioiodine scan) and tissue activity (a radioiodine uptake) of the thyroid gland.

A normal radioiodine scan shows even uptake and activity throughout the gland. Irregular uptake can reflect an abnormally shaped or abnormally located gland, or it can indicate that a portion of the gland is overactive or underactive. For example, a nodule that is overactive ("hot") -- to the point of suppressing the activity of the rest of the gland—is usually a thyrotoxic adenoma, a surgically curable form of hyperthyroidism that is rarely malignant. In contrast, finding that a substantial section of the thyroid is inactive ("cold") may indicate an area of non-functioning tissue, such as thyroid cancer.

The amount of radioactivity can be quantified and serves as an indicator of the metabolic activity of the gland. A normal quantitation of radioiodine uptake demonstrates that about 8-35% of the administered dose can be detected in the thyroid 24 hours later. Overactivity or underactivity of the gland, as may occur with hyperthyroidism or hypothyroidism, is usually reflected in increased or decreased radioiodine uptake. Different patterns may occur with different causes of hypo- or hyperthyroidism.

=== Biopsy ===
A medical biopsy refers to the obtaining of a tissue sample for examination under the microscope or other testing, usually to distinguish cancer from noncancerous conditions. Thyroid tissue may be obtained for biopsy by fine needle aspiration (FNA) or by surgery.

Fine needle aspiration has the advantage of being a brief, safe, outpatient procedure that is safer and less expensive than surgery and does not leave a visible scar. Needle biopsies became widely used in the 1980s, though it was recognized that the accuracy of identification of cancer was good, but not perfect. The accuracy of the diagnosis depends on obtaining tissue from all of the suspicious areas of an abnormal thyroid gland. The reliability of fine needle aspiration is increased when sampling can be guided by ultrasound, and over the last 15 years, this has become the preferred method for thyroid biopsy in North America.

== Treatment ==
=== Medication ===
Levothyroxine is a stereoisomer of thyroxine (T4) which is degraded much more slowly and can be administered once daily in patients with hypothyroidism. Natural thyroid hormone from pigs is sometimes also used, especially for people who cannot tolerate the synthetic version. Hyperthyroidism caused by Graves' disease may be treated with the thioamide drugs propylthiouracil, carbimazole or methimazole, or rarely with Lugol's solution. Additionally, hyperthyroidism and thyroid tumors may be treated with radioactive iodine. Ethanol injections for the treatment of recurrent thyroid cysts and metastatic thyroid cancer in lymph nodes can also be an alternative to surgery.

=== Surgery ===
Thyroid surgery is performed for a variety of reasons. A nodule or lobe of the thyroid is sometimes removed for biopsy or because of the presence of an autonomously functioning adenoma causing hyperthyroidism. A large majority of the thyroid may be removed (subtotal thyroidectomy) to treat the hyperthyroidism of Graves' disease, or to remove a goiter that is unsightly or impinges on vital structures.

A complete thyroidectomy of the entire thyroid, including associated lymph nodes, is the preferred treatment for thyroid cancer. Removal of the bulk of the thyroid gland usually produces hypothyroidism unless the person takes thyroid hormone replacement. Consequently, individuals who have undergone a total thyroidectomy are typically placed on thyroid hormone replacement (e.g. levothyroxine) for the remainder of their lives. Higher than normal doses are often administered to prevent recurrence.

If the thyroid gland must be removed surgically, care must be taken to avoid damage to adjacent structures, the parathyroid glands and the recurrent laryngeal nerve. Both are susceptible to accidental removal and/or injury during thyroid surgery.

The parathyroid glands produce parathyroid hormone (PTH), a hormone needed to maintain adequate amounts of calcium in the blood. Removal results in hypoparathyroidism and a need for supplemental calcium and vitamin D each day. In the event that the blood supply to any one of the parathyroid glands is endangered through surgery, the parathyroid gland(s) involved may be re-implanted in surrounding muscle tissue.

The recurrent laryngeal nerves provide motor control for all external muscles of the larynx except for the cricothyroid muscle, which also runs along the posterior thyroid. Accidental laceration of either of the two or both recurrent laryngeal nerves may cause paralysis of the vocal cords and their associated muscles, changing the voice quality. A 2019 systematic review concluded that the available evidence shows no difference between visually identifying the nerve or utilizing intraoperative neuroimaging during surgery, when trying to prevent injury to recurrent laryngeal nerve during thyroid surgery.

=== Radioiodine ===
Radioiodine therapy with iodine-131 can be used to shrink the thyroid gland (for instance, in the case of large goiters that cause symptoms but do not harbor cancer—after evaluation and biopsy of suspicious nodules has been done), or to destroy hyperactive thyroid cells (for example, in cases of thyroid cancer). The iodine uptake can be high in countries with iodine deficiency, but low in iodine sufficient countries. To enhance iodine-131 uptake by the thyroid and allow for more successful treatment, TSH is raised prior to therapy in order to stimulate the existing thyroid cells. This is done either by withdrawal of thyroid hormone medication or injections of recombinant human TSH (Thyrogen), released in the United States in 1999. Thyrogen injections can reportedly boost uptake up to 50-60%. Radioiodine treatment can also cause hypothyroidism (which is sometimes the end goal of treatment) and, although rare, a pain syndrome (due to radiation thyroiditis).

== Epidemiology ==
In the United States, autoimmune inflammation is the most common form of thyroid disease while worldwide hypothyroidism and goiter due to dietary iodine deficiency is the most common. According to the American Thyroid Association in 2015, approximately 20 million people in the United States alone are affected by thyroid disease. Hypothyroidism affects 3-10% percent of adults, with a higher incidence in women and the elderly. An estimated one-third of the world's population currently lives in areas of low dietary iodine levels. In regions of severe iodine deficiency, the prevalence of goiter is as high as 80%. In areas where iodine-deficiency is not found, the most common type of hypothyroidism is an autoimmune subtype called Hashimoto's thyroiditis, with a prevalence of 1-2%. As for hyperthyroidism, Graves' disease, another autoimmune condition, is the most common type with a prevalence of 0.5% in males and 3% in females. Although thyroid nodules are common, thyroid cancer is rare. Thyroid cancer accounts for less than 1% of all cancer in the UK, though it is the most common endocrine tumor and makes up greater than 90% of all cancers of the endocrine glands.

== See also ==
- Hyperthyroidism
  - Graves' disease
- Hypothyroidism
  - Hashimoto's thyroiditis
- Thyroid nodule
- Thyroid disease in pregnancy
