= Subacute thyroiditis =

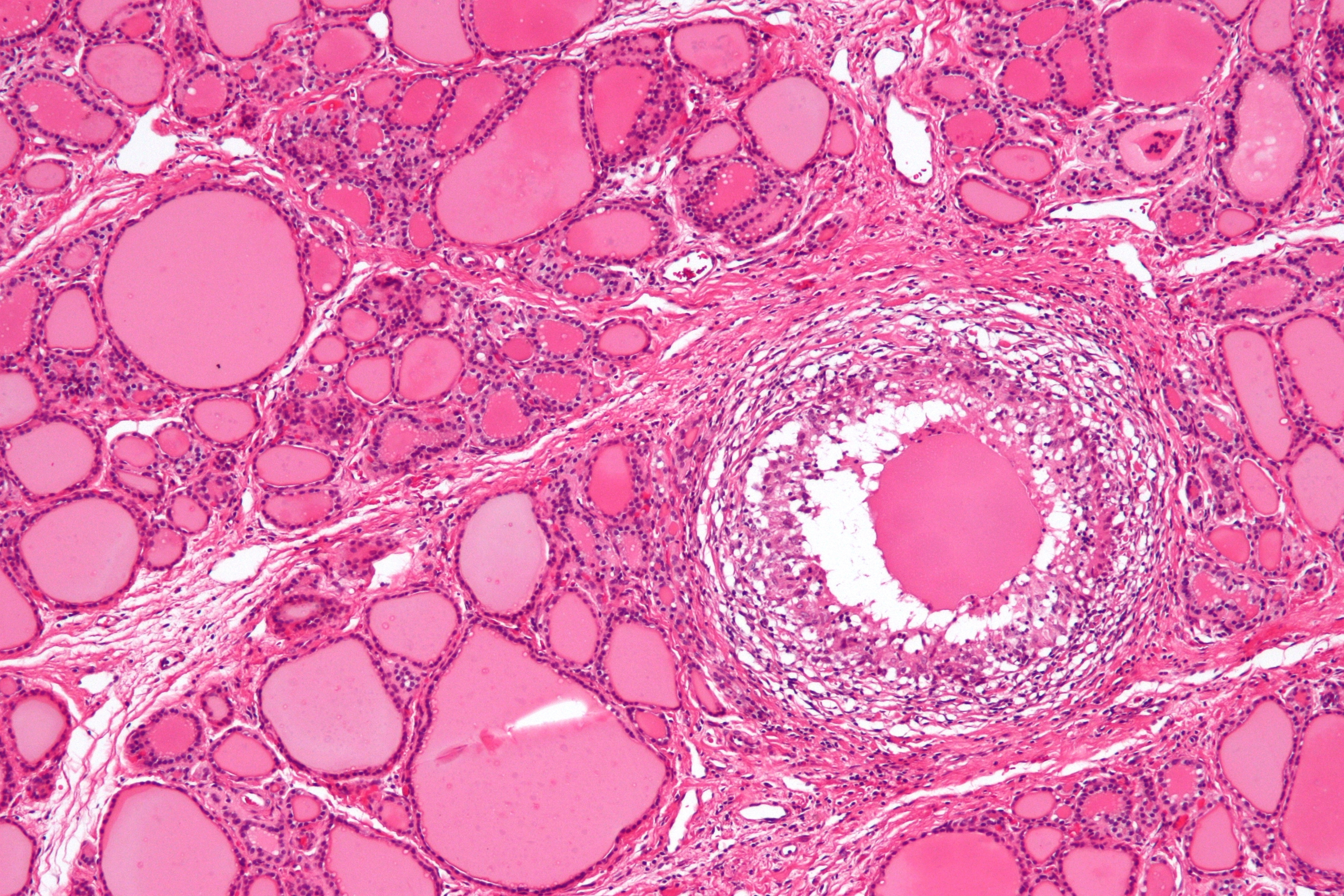
- Micrograph showing a granuloma in subacute granulomatous thyroiditis. H&E stain.
- Specialty: Endocrinology

Subacute thyroiditis refers to a temporal classification of the different forms of thyroiditis based on onset of symptoms. The temporal classification of thyroiditis includes presentation of symptoms in an acute, subacute, or chronic manner. There are also other classification systems for thyroiditis based on factors such as clinical symptoms and underlying etiology.

Broadly, there are three categories of thyroiditis that can present in a subacute fashion, including subacute granulomatous thyroiditis, subacute lymphocytic thyroiditis, and drug-induced thyroiditis. In all three categories, there is inflammation of the thyroid gland causing damage to the thyroid follicular cells which produce and secrete thyroid hormone. This often results in three phases of thyroid dysfunction beginning with initial thyrotoxicosis followed by hypothyroidism before resolution back to normal thyroid function. In the thyrotoxic stage, individuals usually complain of fever, myalgia, and may have associated anterior neck pain among other symptoms. In the hypothyroid stage, they may be asymptomatic or experience mild symptoms. In most cases, the thyroid dysfunction is transient and people recover with symptomatic treatment.

== Etiology ==
Among the different classification systems for thyroiditis, the onset of symptoms can be used to classify thyroiditis as acute, subacute, or chronic. The three types of thyroiditis that can occur in a subacute manner include subacute granulomatous thyroiditis, subacute lymphocytic thyroiditis, and drug-induced thyroiditis.

Subacute granulomatous thyroiditis affects more women than men and often follows a viral upper respiratory tract infection with many implicated viruses including Coxsackievirus, Epstein-Barr virus, and recently SARS-CoV-2 among others.

Subacute lymphocytic thyroiditis, also called painless or silent thyroiditis, occurs in individuals with underlying autoimmune disease or after pregnancy. It is considered to be a variant of Hashimoto's thyroiditis. When subacute lymphocytic thyroiditis occurs up to 12 months postpartum, it is called postpartum thyroiditis. It has an increased incidence in women with presence of thyroid peroxidase (TPO) antibodies prior to pregnancy and in women with preexisting Type 1 diabetes. Postpartum thyroiditis can recur in subsequent pregnancies.

Drug-induced thyroiditis can occur in individuals receiving certain therapies such as amiodarone, interferon-alpha, lithium, tyrosine-kinase inhibitors, and immunotherapies among other drugs. These individuals may develop subacute lymphocytic thyroiditis.

== Pathophysiology ==
In all three types of thyroiditis, there is inflammation of the thyroid gland which leads to clinical symptoms in three phases. The initial thyrotoxic phase is followed by hypothyroid phase before reaching a euthyroid phase where normal thyroid function in restored. The timing of each phase varies and not every person experiences all three phases. In the thyrotoxic phase, the follicular cells of the thyroid gland are damaged leading to release of pre-formed thyroid hormone and symptoms of thyrotoxicosis. The damage to the follicles impairs ability to produce and secrete thyroid hormones which then leads to a hypothyroid phase. As inflammation resolves, the thyroid follicles regenerate and begin to produce thyroid hormones once again.

In subacute granulomatous thyroiditis, there is infiltration of neutrophils and other immune cells which cause damage to the thyroid follicular cells. The damage leads to formation of granulomas with multi-nucleated giant cells and associated fibrosis. In contrast, subacute lymphocytic thyroiditis is characterized by an infiltration of lymphocytes causing damage to the thyroid gland, similar to Hashimoto's thyroiditis.

== Signs and symptoms ==
The symptoms of subacute thyroiditis depend on the etiology. In subacute granulomatous thyroiditis, there may be a history of a viral infection preceding onset of symptoms. The presenting symptom is usually anterior neck pain that may be unilateral or bilateral with radiation to jaw or ears. Individuals can also experience dysphagia due to diffusely enlarged thyroid gland. There are often associated systemic symptoms of fever, malaise, and arthralgia. The thyrotoxic phase can last for 3–6 weeks during which some may experience mild symptoms associated with elevated thyroid hormones as they leaks out of the damaged thyroid gland. During this phase, one can experience diaphoresis, tremors, heat intolerance, or weight loss. Upon examination, the thyroid gland is often firm, diffusely enlarged, and tender to palpation. The thyroid may be smooth or nodular. As the thyroid hormone stores are depleted, about a third of the individuals will enter a hypothyroid phase which may last up to six months. There is no neck pain in the hypothyroid phase and little to no other symptoms. Most people return to normal thyroid function within one year of symptom onset; however, between 5-15% of individuals develop permanent hypothyroidism. Some individuals may also have relapse of symptoms.

In those with subacute lymphocytic thyroiditis, the thyroid gland is not tender to palpation (hence the name of painless or silent thyroiditis). The thyroid gland may be firm, finely nodular, and may or may not be diffusely enlarged. Similar to subacute granulomatous thyroiditis, there is an initial transient thyrotoxic phase that can last 2–5 months followed by a hypothyroid phase. Thyrotoxic symptoms are usually mild and in some individuals, the hypothyroid phase is the only symptomatic phase. In the hypothyroid phase, patient may experience cold intolerance, fatigue, weight gain, or depression. The hypothyroidism may or may not resolve spontaneously.

Those who develop drug-induced thyroiditis may have clinical course similar to subacute lymphocytic thyroiditis or other forms of thyroiditis.

== Diagnosis ==
The diagnosis of subacute thyroiditis can be made clinically by eliciting risk factors, associated symptoms, and physical examination. Further work-up to differentiate between the etiologies of subacute thyroiditis can include: thyroid function tests (TFTs), inflammatory markers, complete blood count (CBC), and thyroid antibodies. Additionally, radioactive iodine uptake (RAIU) and scan can be performed in the thyrotoxic stage to help differentiate between other causes of thyrotoxicosis.

In subacute granulomatous thyroiditis, a prodrome of a viral illness, painful thyroid, and symptoms of thyrotoxicosis may be present. Thyroid function test will evolve through the three phases of thyrotoxicosis, hypothyroidism, and euthyroid state. In the thyrotoxic phase, thyroid stimulating hormone (TSH) will be low with high or normal levels of thyroid hormones. Inflammatory markers such as C-reactive protein (CRP) and erythrocyte sedimentation rate (ESR) are elevated. RAIU will be low in the thyrotoxic phase which helps to distinguish subacute granulomatous thyroiditis from other cause of thyrotoxicosis such as Graves' disease. White blood count is usually normal or mildly elevated and there are no thyroid antibodies present. Thyroid imaging and fine needle aspiration (FNA) are usually not needed for diagnosis.

In subacute lymphocytic thyroiditis, thyroid function tests will also evolve through the phases and RAIU will be low in the thyrotoxic phase. It can be distinguished from subacute granulomatous thyroiditis by lack of pain, presence of TPO or thyroglobulin (Tg) antibodies, and normal inflammatory markers. Fine needle aspiration (FNA) should be performed in patients who also have a thyroid nodule to rule out thyroid cancer.

== Treatment ==
The goal of treatment of subacute thyroiditis is to help reduce pain and symptoms of thyrotoxicosis. In drug-induced thyroiditis, management begins with discontinuation of the offending drug followed by symptomatic treatment. First line treatment for pain is high doses of nonsteroidal anti-inflammatory drugs (NSAIDs) such as ibuprofen. Acetylsalicylic acid such as aspirin may also be used in high doses. If symptoms are severe and there is no relief with NSAIDs or acetylsalicylic acid, corticosteroids such as prednisone can be used. Beta blockers such as propranolol can be used for severe symptoms related to elevated thyroid hormone in all three categories of subacute thyroiditis. There is no role for antithyroid drugs since the thyrotoxic phase is due to a transient process. Replacement of thyroid hormone with levothyroxine may be needed in patients who develop a hypothyroid phase. Annual followup is recommended for these individuals due to risk of recurrence and development of permanent hypothyroidism.
