= Acute infectious thyroiditis =

- Other names: suppurative thyroiditis
- Specialty: Endocrinology

Acute infectious thyroiditis (AIT) also known as suppurative thyroiditis, microbial inflammatory thyroiditis, pyrogenic thyroiditis and bacterial thyroiditis.

The thyroid is normally very resistant to infection. Due to a relatively high amount of iodine in the tissue, as well as high vascularity and lymphatic drainage to the region, it is difficult for pathogens to infect the thyroid tissue. Despite all this, a persistent fistula from the piriform sinus may make the left lobe of the thyroid susceptible to infection and abscess formation. AIT is most often caused by a bacterial infection but can also be caused by a fungal or parasitic infection, most commonly in an immunocompromised host.

== Signs and symptoms ==
In most cases AIT is characterized by onset of pain, firmness, tenderness, redness or swelling in the anterior aspect of the neck. Patients will also present with a sudden fever, difficulty swallowing and difficulty controlling the voice. Symptoms may be present from 1 to 180 days, with most symptoms lasting an average of about 18 days. The main issue associated with the diagnosis of AIT is differentiating it from other more commonly seen forms of thyroid conditions. Pain, fever and swelling are often much more severe and continue to get worse in people who have AIT compared to those with other thyroid conditions.

== Causes ==
Despite the thyroid gland being extremely resistant to infection, it is still susceptible to infection by various bacteria. The cause can be almost any bacterium. Staphylococcus aureus, Streptococcus pyogenes, Staphylococcus epidermidis, and Streptococcus pneumoniae in descending order are the organisms most commonly isolated from acute thyroiditis cases in children. Other aerobic organisms are Klebsiella sp, Haemophilus influenza, Streptococcus viridans, Eikenella corrodens, Enterobacteriaceae, and salmonella sp. Occurrences of AIT are most common in patients with prior thyroid disease such as Hashimoto's thyroiditis or thyroid cancer. The most common cause of infection in children is a congenital abnormality such as pyriform sinus fistula. In most cases, the infection originates in the piriform sinus and spreads to the thyroid via the fistula. In many reported cases of AIT the infection occurs following an upper respiratory tract infection. One study found that of the reported cases of AIT, 66% occurred after an acute illness involving the upper respiratory tract. Other causes of AIT are commonly due to contamination from an outside source and are included below.

- Repeated fine needle aspirates
- Perforation of esophagus
- Regional infection

== Diagnosis ==
Patients who are suspected of having AIT often undergo tests to detect for elevated levels of white blood cells as well as an ultrasound to reveal unilobular swelling. Depending on the age and immune status of the patient more invasive procedures may be performed such as fine needle aspiration of the neck mass to facilitate a diagnosis. In cases where the infection is thought to be associated with a sinus fistula it is often necessary to confirm the presence of the fistula through surgery or laryngoscopic examination. While invasive procedures can often tell definitively whether or not a fistula is present, new studies are working on the use of computed tomography as a useful method to visualize and detect the presence of a sinus fistula.

=== Diagnostic tests ===
- Fever, redness, swelling
- Pain
- Blood tests of thyroid functions including TSH, T4 and T3 are usually normal
- Ultrasonographic examination often shows the abscess or swelling in thyroid
- Gallium scan will be positive
- Barium swallow will show fistula connection to the piriform sinus and left lobe
- Elevated white blood cell count
- Elevated erythrocyte sedimentation rate
- Fine-needle aspiration

=== Subtypes of thyroiditis ===
Subtypes	Causes
Hashimoto's thyroiditis, Chronic lymphocytic thyroiditis, Chronic autoimmune thyroiditis, Lymphadenoid goiter	Autoimmune
Subacute lymphocytic thyroiditis, Postpartum thyroiditis, Sporadic painless thyroiditis, Silent sporadic thyroiditis	Autoimmune
Acute infectious thyroiditis, Microbial inflammatory thyroiditis, Suppurative thyroiditis, Pyrogenic thyroiditis, Bacterial thyroiditis	Cause: Bacterial, Parasitic, Fungal
de Quervain's thyroiditis, Subacute granulomatous thyroiditis, Giant-cell thyroiditis, Pseudogranulomatous thyroiditis, Painful subacute thyroiditis,	Viral
Riedel's thyroiditis, Riedel's struma, Invasive fibrous thyroiditis	Unknown

== Treatment ==
Treatment of AIT involves antibiotic treatment. Based on the offending organism found on microscopic examination of the stained fine needle aspirate, the appropriate antibiotic treatment is determined. In the case of a severe infection, systemic antibiotics are necessary. Empirical broad spectrum antimicrobial treatment provides preliminary coverage for a variety of bacteria, including S. aureus and S. pyogenes. Antimicrobial options include penicillinase-resistant penicillins (ex: cloxacillin, dicloxacillin) or a combination of a penicillin and a beta-lactamase inhibitor. However, in patients with a penicillin allergy, clindamycin or a macrolide can be prescribed. The majority of anaerobic organisms involved with AIT are susceptible to penicillin. Certain Gram-negative bacilli (ex: Prevotella, Fusobacteriota, and Porphyromonas) are exhibiting an increased resistance based on the production of beta-lactamase. Patients who have undergone recent penicillin therapy have demonstrated an increase in beta-lactamase-producing (anaerobic and aerobic) bacteria. Clindamycin, or a combination of metronidazole and a macrolide, or a penicillin combined with a beta-lactamase inhibitor is recommended in these cases. Fungal thyroiditis can be treated with amphotericin B and fluconazole. Early treatment of AIT prevents further complications. However, if antibiotic treatment does not manage the infection, surgical drainage is required. Symptoms or indications requiring drainage include continued fever, high white blood cell count, and continuing signs of localized inflammation. The draining procedure is also based on clinical examination or ultrasound/CT scan results that indicate an abscess or gas formation. Another treatment of AIT involves surgically removing the fistula. This treatment is often the option recommended for children. However, in cases of an antibiotic resistant infection or necrotic tissue, a lobectomy is recommended. If diagnosis and/or treatment is delayed, the disease could prove fatal.

== Epidemiology ==
Acute infectious thyroiditis is very rare, with it only accounting for about 0.1–0.7% of all thyroiditis. Large hospitals tend to only see two cases of AIT annually. For the few cases of AIT that are seen the statistics seem to show a pattern. AIT is found in children and young adults between the ages of 20 and 40. The occurrence of the disease in people between 20 and 40 is only about 8% with the other 92% being in children. Men and women are each just as likely to get the disease. If left untreated, there is a 12% mortality rate.
