= RAIU (disambiguation) =

RAIU or Raiu may refer to:

- Radioactive iodine uptake test for thyroid problems
- Railway Accident Investigation Unit, Ireland
- Raiu, a village administered by Murgeni town, Vaslui County, Romania
