= Transmembrane protein 205 =

Protein-coding gene in the species Homo sapiens

TMEM205

Identifiers
- Aliases: TMEM205, UNQ501, transmembrane protein 205
- External IDs: OMIM: 613771; MGI: 3045495; HomoloGene: 43895; GeneCards: TMEM205; OMA:TMEM205 - orthologs

Gene location (Human)
Chr.	Chromosome 19 (human)
Band	19p13.2	Start	11,342,776 bp
Band	19p13.2	End	11,346,518 bp

Gene location (Mouse)
Chr.	Chromosome 9 (mouse)
Band	9|9 A3	Start	21,832,304 bp
Band	9|9 A3	End	21,838,852 bp
RNA expression pattern
Bgee	Human / Mouse (ortholog); Top expressed in: left adrenal cortex; right adrenal gland; right adrenal cortex; right lobe of liver; right lobe of thyroid gland; left lobe of thyroid gland; apex of heart; anterior pituitary; right frontal lobe; prefrontal cortex / Top expressed in: left lobe of liver; right kidney; adrenal gland; choroid plexus of fourth ventricle; proximal tubule; Epithelium of choroid plexus; spermatid; human kidney; right ventricle; vestibular membrane of cochlear duct; More reference expression data
BioGPS	n/a
Orthologs
Species	Human	Mouse
Entrez	374882	235043
Ensembl	ENSG00000105518	ENSMUSG00000040883
UniProt	Q6UW68	Q91XE8
RefSeq (mRNA)	NM_001145416; NM_033408; NM_198536; NM_001321112; NM_001321113 NM_001321114	NM_001253867; NM_001253868; NM_001253869; NM_001253870; NM_178577
RefSeq (protein)	NP_001138888; NP_001308041; NP_001308042; NP_001308043; NP_212133 NP_940938	NP_001240796; NP_001240797; NP_001240798; NP_001240799; NP_848692
Location (UCSC)	Chr 19: 11.34 – 11.35 Mb	Chr 9: 21.83 – 21.84 Mb
PubMed search
- Wikidata
View/Edit Human	View/Edit Mouse

Transmembrane Protein 205 (TMEM205) is a protein encoded on chromosome 19 by the TMEM205 gene.

== Gene ==
TMEM205 is located on the minus strand of chromosome 19 from base pair 11,453,452 to 11,456,981. In close proximity to TMEM205, CCDC159 is located slightly upstream and RAB3D slightly down stream of the genomic sequence.

== Homology ==
TMEM205 has no known Paralogs in the Human genome. Using UCSC genome browser BLAT against the human protein sequence it was found that the closest relative to humans to contain a paralog of the TMEM205 gene in its genome is the Bushbaby. TMEM205 does however have a large range of ortholog sequences.

Genus Species	Organism common name	Divergence from humans (MYA)	NCBI Protein Accession	Sequence similarity	Protein length
Homo sapiens	Human	0	AAH91472.1	100%	189
Pan troglodytes	Chimpanzee	6.4	XP_003316117.1	100%	189
Pongo pygmaeus	Orangutan	15.8	NP 001124814.1	99%	189
Gorilla gorilla	Gorilla	8.8	XP_004060075.1	99%	189
Callithrix jacchus	Common Marmoset	43.9	XP_002761800.1	96%	189
Mus musculus	Mouse	94.1	BAA92792764.1	88%	189
Sarcophilus harrisii	Tasmanian Devil	162.6	XP_003760487.1	77%	193
Crotalus adamanteus	Rattle Snake	296	AFJ51753.1	85%	188
Xenopus	Xenopus	371	NP_001037942.1	68%	189

== Protein ==
The human homologue of TMEM205 is 189 amino acids long and has a molecular weight of 21.2 kDa. It contains 4 hydrophobic helical domains that are predicted to be transmembrane domains.

== Expression ==
TMEM205 has been shown to be expressed in greater amounts in tissues that have secretory function. These tissues include the thyroid, adrenal gland, pancrease, and mammary tissues. The protein has also been shown to have increased expression in tumor tissue that have become resistant to platinum based chemotherapy drugs.

== Function ==
TMEM205 is thought to be a multi-pass transmembrane protein. It has been shown to be located at the plasma membrane in humans tissues and translocates to the nuclear envelope when cells become resistant to Cisplatin. It contains four domains predicted to be trans membrane domains by TMHMM analysis.

== Interacting proteins ==
TMEM205 has been shown to be co-located with RAB8 a known GTPase involved in vesicular traffic.

== Clinical significance ==
TMEM205 has been shown to be involved in Cisplatin resistance. Cisplatin is a chemotherapeutic drug that is commonly used to treat solid malignancies such as carcinomas, sarcomas, and lymphomas. In addition to being involved in Cisplatin resistance there is growing evidence that the protein is also involved in the diseases thyroiditis and prostatitis
