= Subacute lymphocytic thyroiditis =

- Other names: Silent thyroiditis, painless thyroiditis, subacute lymphocytic thyroiditis
- Specialty: Endocrinology

Silent thyroiditis is a form of thyroiditis. It may occur at any age and is more common in females. When silent thyroiditis occurs postpartum it is called postpartum thyroiditis. Both of these entities can be considered subtypes of Hashimoto's thyroiditis and have an autoimmune basis. Anti-thyroid antibodies are common in all three and the underlying histology is similar. This disorder should not be confused with de Quervain's thyroiditis which is another form of subacute thyroiditis.

== Symptoms and signs ==
Silent thyroiditis features a small goiter without tenderness. This condition tends to have a phase of hyperthyroidism followed by a return to a euthyroid state, and then a phase of hypothyroidism, followed again by a return to the euthyroid state. The time span of each phase can vary; however, each phase usually lasts 2–3 months.

== Diagnosis ==
Silent thyroiditis can only be diagnosed definitively by taking a radioactive iodine uptake test (RAIU) test. During both the hyperthyroid and hypothyroid phases, radioiodine uptake is decreased. This situation contrasts greatly with the elevated iodine uptake found in patients with Graves' disease.

== Treatment ==
Treatment is based on symptoms. Beta-blockers relieve rapid heart rate and excessive sweating during the hyperthyroid phase.
