= Riedel's thyroiditis =

- Other names: Chronic Invasive Fibrous Thyroiditis
- Pronunciation: ˈrēd-ᵊlz-
- Specialty: Endocrinology
- Symptoms: Goiter, Painless, Hard (Stone-like), Fixed thyroid
- Differential diagnosis: Anaplastic thyroid carcinoma Thyroid lymphoma Thyroid sarcoma
- Treatment: No Standard Treatment
- Prognosis: Good. In a 9.5 years follow up, 86% of patients were stable

Riedel's thyroiditis (also known as invasive fibrous thyroiditis), is a chronic form of thyroiditis. It is now believed that Riedel's thyroiditis is one manifestation of a systemic disease that can affect many organ systems called IgG4-related disease. It is often a multi-organ disease affecting pancreas, liver, kidney, salivary and orbital tissues and retroperitoneal space. The hallmarks of the disease are fibrosis and infiltration by IgG4 secreting plasma cells.

== Signs and symptoms ==
IgG4-related autoimmune diseases are characterized by excessive fibrosis. In case of Riedel's thyroiditis, fibrosis extends beyond the capsule and involves contiguous neck structures, clinically simulating thyroid carcinoma. There is a rapid thyroid enlargement. Compression of trachea, dysphagia are probable outcomes. Marked thyroid follicular cell atrophy confirms hypothyroidism. Signs of hypothyroidism include myxedema, lethargy, cold-intolerance, apathy, slowed intellectual functions, dysthymia or simply depressive-mood, decreased sympathetic activity induced constipation and decreased perspiration. Reduced cardiac output contributes shortness of breath and decreased blood flow explains skin pallor.

== Pathophysiology ==
Riedel's thyroiditis is characterized by a replacement of the normal thyroid parenchyma by a dense fibrosis that invades adjacent structures of the neck and extends beyond the thyroid capsule. This makes the thyroid gland stone-hard (woody) and fixed to adjacent structures. The inflammatory process infiltrates muscles and causes symptoms of tracheal compression. Surgical treatment is required to relieve tracheal or esophageal obstruction.

== Diagnosis ==
It typically present as a painless, hard anterior neck mass, which progresses over weeks to years to produce symptoms of compression, including dysphagia, dyspnea choking and hoarseness. Patients may present with symptoms of hypothyroidism and hypoparathyroidism as the gland is replaced by Fibrous tissues . Physical examination reveals a hard "woody" thyroid gland with fixation to surrounding tissue. The diagnosis needs to be confirmed by open thyroid biopsy because the firm and Fibrous nature of the gland renders FNAB inadequate.

== Treatment ==
Therapy usually consists of prednisolone, nonetheless some cases may require surgery. Tamoxifen has been proposed as part of a treatment plan.

Treatment is directed to surgical relief of compressive symptoms. Tamoxifen may also be beneficial. The type of surgery which is indicated here is isthmectomy.

== Prevalence ==
Riedel's thyroiditis is classified as rare. Most patients remain euthyroid, but approximately 30% of patients become hypothyroid and very few patients are hyperthyroid. It is most commonly seen in women.

== Eponym ==
It is named for Bernhard Riedel. He first recognized the disease In 1883 and published its description in 1896.
