= Bernhard Moritz Carl Ludwig Riedel =

German surgeon (1846–1916)

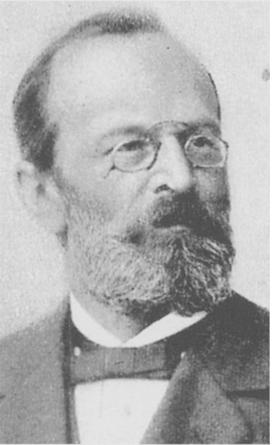
Bernhard Moritz Carl Ludwig Riedel (1846–1916)

Bernhard Moritz Carl Ludwig Riedel (18 September 1846 – 12 September 1916) was a German surgeon, who was a native of Teschentin, Grossherzogtum Mecklenburg (Grand Duchy of Mecklenburg).

== Biography ==
He graduated from the University of Rostock in 1872, and for the next three years was prosector at Rostock under Friedrich Sigmund Merkel (1845–1919). In 1875, he became an assistant to Franz König (1832–1910) in Göttingen, where he was habilitated for surgery in 1877. In the ensuing years, he studied surgery with Bernhard von Langenbeck (1810–1887) and Heinrich Adolf von Bardeleben (1819–1895), later being appointed chief physician of the surgical department at the Städtisches Krankenhaus in Aachen (1881). In 1888, he became director of the surgical clinic at the University of Jena.

Riedel was a pioneer in the surgical treatment of appendicitis and cholecystitis. In 1888, he performed the first choledochoduodenostomy (anastomosis of the common bile duct to the duodenum). His name is lent to the following medical eponyms:

- Riedel thyroiditis: (sometimes called ligneous thyroiditis, invasive fibrous thyroiditis or struma fibromatosis): An uncommon thyroid disease in which the thyroid gland is replaced by extensive fibrosis. First described by Riedel in 1896.
- Riedel's lobe: A tongue-shaped process of the liver, often found protruding over the gallbladder in cases of chronic cholecystitis.

== Honors ==
- Member of the German Academy of Sciences, Leopoldina (1888)
- The Riedel goiter, a thyroid disorder, the Riedel'sche appendix of the liver or Riedel flap, sinus surgery after Riedel and the Riedel'sche tumor were named after Riedel.
- Chairman of the German Society of Surgery (1907)
- Privy Medical Councillor
- Honorary member of the Corps Thuringia Jena
