= Jean-Francois Coindet =

Physiologist

Jean-François Coindet
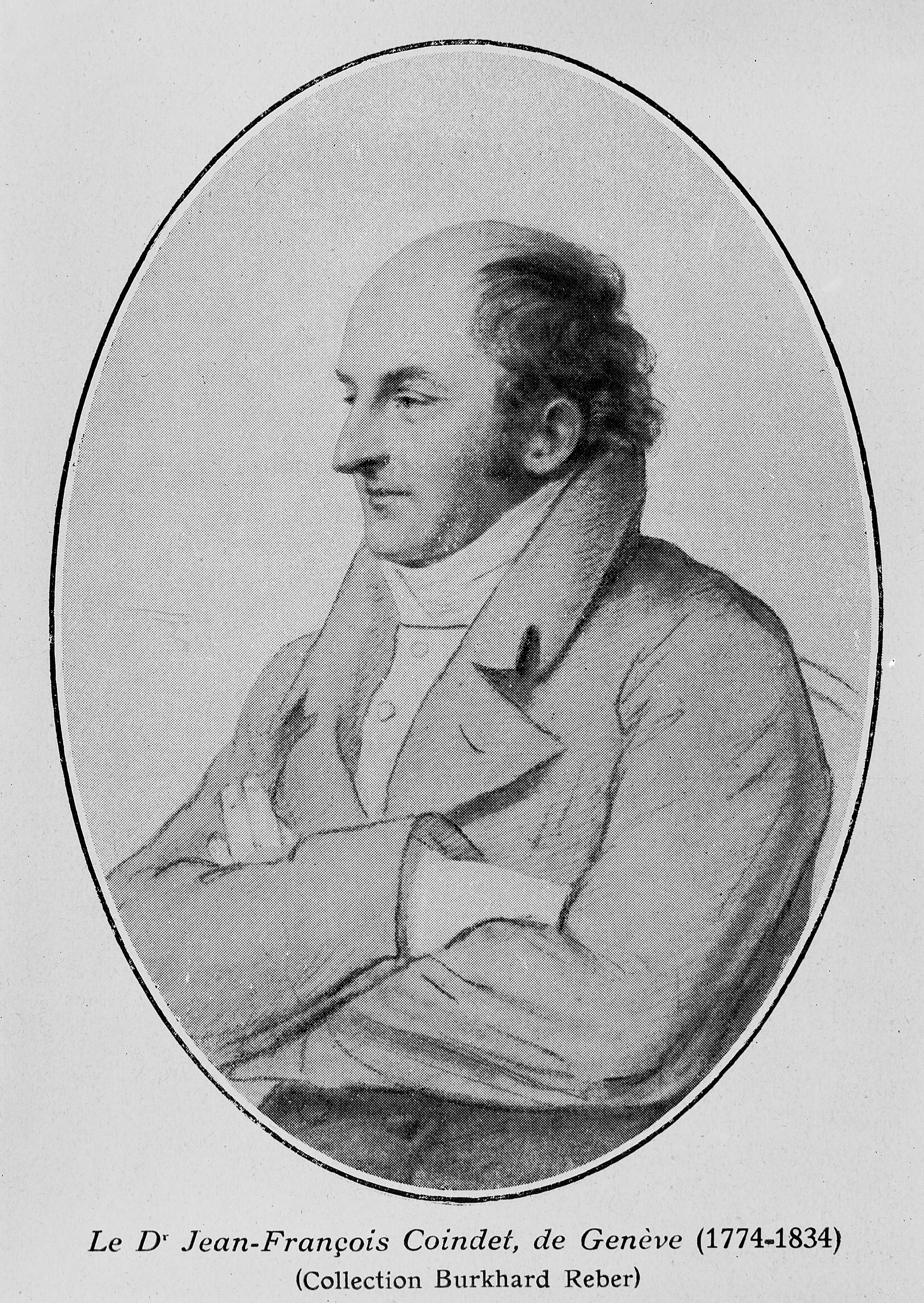
- Born: July 12, 1774; Geneva, Switzerland
- Died: February 11, 1834 (aged 59); Nice, France
- Education: Edinburgh
- Known for: Treatment of iodine deficiency
- Medical career
- Profession: Physician
- Institutions: Geneva Hospital
- Sub-specialties: Goitre research
- Awards: Prize of the French Academy of Sciences (1831)

Jean-François Coindet (July 12, 1774 – February 11, 1834) was a Swiss medical doctor and researcher who is known for introducing iodine as a treatment of goitre.

== Early life ==
Jean-François Coindet was born on July 12, 1774, in Geneva as the son of Jean Jacques Coindet and Catherine Gros. He married Catherine Walker, the daughter of Charles Walker who owned a tavern in Edinburgh. Jean-François attended school in Geneva but there was no medical school in Geneva at the time, so he went to Edinburgh in 1792 to study medicine. Coindet received his medical degree in 1797 with a thesis about smallpox (De Variolis).

Coindet returned to Geneva in 1799 and obtained a position at the Geneva Hospital. From 1809 to 1831, he was chief physician at the hospital and furthermore he was prison physician.

== Career ==
In order to cure goitre, Coindet introduced the iodine treatment. He observed a significant shrinking of goitres after only 8 days of iodine therapy. He made his findings public on July 21, 1820, in an article entitled Mémoire sur la découverte d'un nouveau remède contre le goître in Geneva. This was only 9 years after the initial discovery of iodine and Coindet in total wrote a series of three articles in 1820 and 1821 on the topic of iodine treatment of goitre.

After his findings became public, many other physicians also began to prescribe iodine which led to a high rate of adverse effects. This led to a public controversy over the use of iodine. Coindet advised to control the dose of iodine closely to limit adverse effects. In January 1821, the local authorities in Geneva prohibited the sale of iodine unless prescribed by a doctor.

His son Jean Charles Walker Coindet, also studied in Edinburgh and he finished his studies in 1821 with his thesis De Renum Muneribus i.e., About Renal Functions. He returned to Geneva in 1823, and later became a psychiatrist.

In 1823, Coindet established the Medical Society of Geneva together with his son.

In 1831, Coindet was awarded a major prize by the French Academy of Sciences for his research about iodine.
