= Postpartum thyroiditis =

- Specialty: Obstetrics

Postpartum thyroiditis is a type of thyroiditis, inflammation of the thyroid, occurring in the first 12 months after pregnancy and typically involves hyperthyroidism followed by hypothyroidism which is most often temporary.

Postpartum thyroiditis is believed to result from the modifications to the immune system necessary in pregnancy, and histologically is the same as subacute lymphocytic thyroiditis also called silent thyroiditis or painless thyroiditis, a form of subacute thyroiditis. The process is normally self-limiting, but when thyroid antibodies are found there is a high chance of this proceeding to permanent hypothyroidism.

== Signs and symptoms ==
The initial phase of hyperthyroid symptoms occurs transiently about two to six months postpartum. Typical symptoms include irritability, nervousness, palpitations, and heat intolerance. Hormonal disturbances during this phase tend to occur with lower intensity compared with the hypothyroid phase. As a result, the hyperthyroid phase may pass undetected. The second phase of hypothyroid symptoms is also transient and can occur anytime within the three- to twelve-month period postpartum. Women in this phase experience low energy, poor memory, impaired concentration, carelessness, dry skin, cold intolerance, and general aches and pains. After one year postpartum, euthyroid function resumes. Any case with hypothyroid symptoms extending beyond one year postpartum is not considered postpartum thyroiditis.

Women who test positive for thyroid antibodies may be at increased risk of developing symptoms associated with postpartum depression than women without thyroid antibodies.

== Cause ==
During pregnancy, immunologic suppression occurs which induces tolerance to the presence of the fetus. Without this suppression, the fetus would be rejected causing miscarriage. As a result, following delivery, the immune system rebounds causing levels of thyroids antibodies to rise in susceptible women.

Specifically, the immunohistological features of susceptible women are indicated by:

- antibodies to thyroglobulin (TgAb)
- antibodies to thyroid peroxidase (TPOAb)
- increase in TPOAb subclasses IgG1-IgG3
- lymphocyte infiltration and follicle formation within thyroid gland (Hashimoto's thyroiditis)
- T-cell changes (increased CD4:CD8 ratio)
- TSH-receptor antibodies (TSH-R Abs)

== Diagnosis ==
This condition is commonly undiagnosed by physicians due to either unfamiliarity with the disease, the subtlety of symptoms, or the attribution of the symptoms to the stresses of having a newborn. Usual screening begins with assessing the thyroid stimulating hormone (TSH) level. A suppressed TSH could represent the hyperthyroid phase, but warrants further testing to investigate for possible Graves' disease. A normal TSH with persistent symptoms could represent the shift between phases and requires repeat testing 4–6 weeks later; an elevated TSH at this time could indicate the hypothyroid phase.

== Treatment ==
For most women, the hyperthyroid phase presents with very mild symptoms or is asymptomatic; intervention is usually not required. If symptomatic cases require treatment, a short course of beta-blockers would be effective.

Assessing treatment for the hypothyroid is more complex. Women with symptoms or a very high TSH level, or both, are usually prescribed a course of levothyroxine. Asymptomatic women with slightly elevated TSH levels who are planning subsequent pregnancies, should consider a course of treatment until completion of the family to avoid possible developmental complications in future children. Otherwise, treatment could be discontinued after one year postpartum.

== Epidemiology ==
According to the National Institute of Health, postpartum thyroiditis affects about 8% of pregnancies. There are, however, different rates reported globally. This is likely due to the differing amounts of average postpartum follow times around the world, and due to humans' own innate differences. For example, in Bangkok, Thailand the rate is 1.1%, but in Brazil it is 13.3%.

Women with type I diabetes mellitus have a threefold increase in the prevalence of postpartum thyroiditis than non-diabetic women in the same region.
