= Nodular goiter =

Nodular goiter is an enlarged thyroid gland with bumps (nodules) on it. It is associated with both high and low activity of the gland.

- Toxic multinodular goitre, also known as multinodular toxic goiter (MNTG)
- Nontoxic nodular goiter
