= De Quervain's thyroiditis =

- Other names: Giant cell thyroiditis, subacute granulomatous thyroiditis
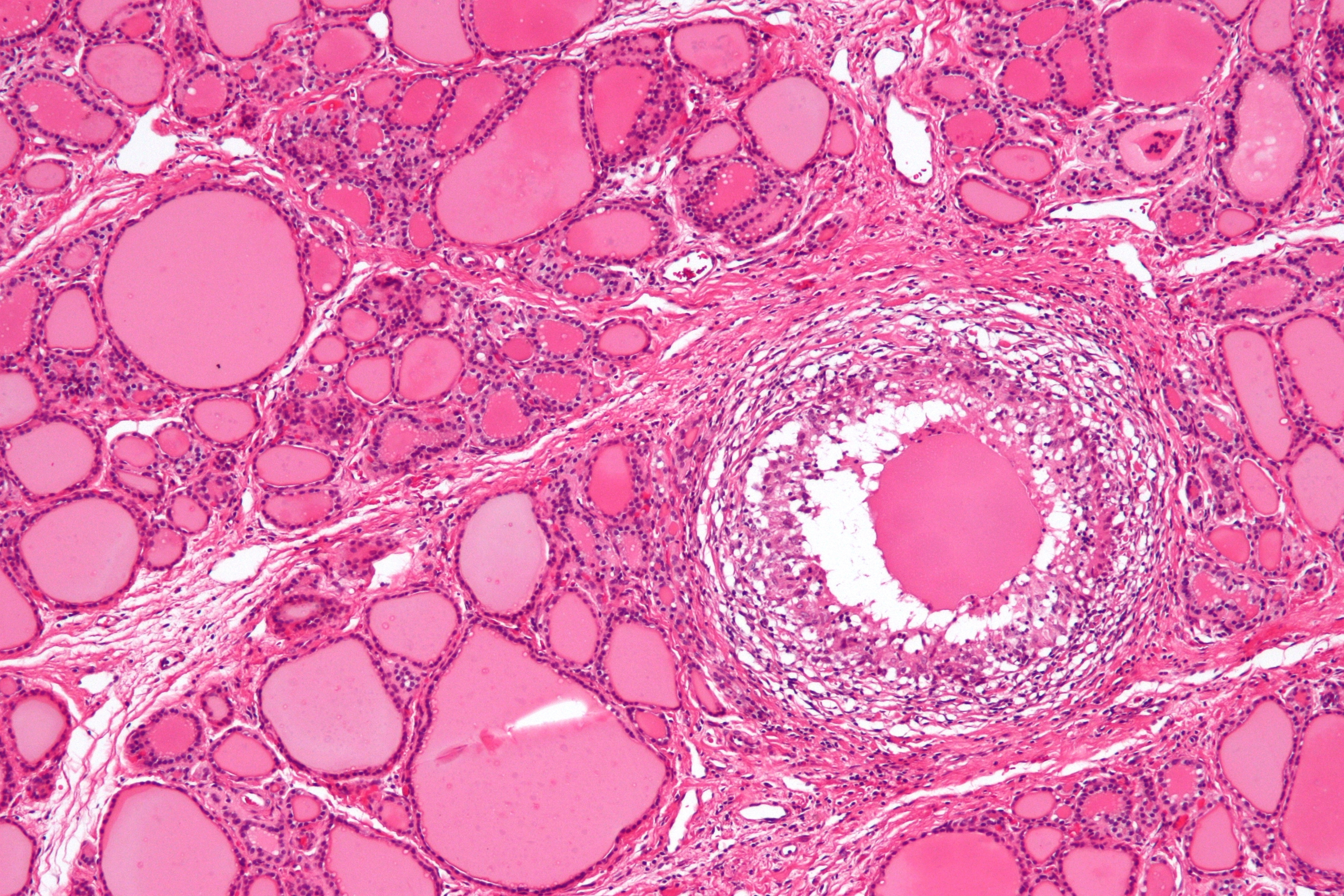
- Micrograph showing a granuloma in subacute thyroiditis. H&E stain.
- Specialty: Endocrinology

De Quervain's thyroiditis, also known as subacute granulomatous thyroiditis or giant cell thyroiditis, is a self-limiting inflammatory illness of the thyroid gland. De Quervain thyroiditis is characterized by fever, flu-like symptoms, a painful goiter, and neck pain. The disease has a natural history of four phases: thyroid pain, thyrotoxicosis, euthyroid phase, hypothyroid phase, and recovery euthyroid phase.

De Quervain's thyroiditis has been linked to various diseases, including mumps, adenovirus, and enterovirus. It may have a hereditary component, with two-thirds of patients having positive histocompatibility antigen (HLA) B35 results. Atypical cases have HLA B15/62 positivity, and it is more common in summer or fall months in people who test positive for HLA B67.

De Quervain thyroiditis is diagnosed through clinical and test results, with laboratory features including elevated C-reactive protein and erythrocyte sedimentation rate. Thyroid function testing often shows decreased thyroid stimulating hormone and increased serum levels of triiodothyronine and thyroxine during the acute phase. Thyroid scans show minimal uptake during the acute phase due to disrupted thyroid follicles, but increase during recovery due to the thyroid gland's enhanced iodine trapping capacity. Thyroid ultrasonography typically shows thyroid gland enlargement and hypoechogenicity, while color Doppler ultrasonography may show low or normal vascular flow. Tissue diagnosis is rare, but fine needle aspiration may be helpful in questionable cases to differentiate unilateral involvement from bleeding into a cyst or tumor.

Treatment involves symptomatic medication, glucocorticoid medication for severe cases, and beta-adrenergic blockers for thyrotoxic symptoms. The condition typically resolves within three to six months. However, 20-56% of adult patients experience transient hypothyroidism, which can persist for years. Recurrent hypothyroidism is rare, occurring in about 2% of cases, and usually manifests within a year after diagnosis. Late recurrences have been reported.

== Signs and symptoms ==
Patients typically present with low-grade fever and flu-like symptoms such as sore throat, myalgia, arthralgia, and malaise, which are followed by high-grade fever, a painful, widespread goiter, and neck pain. The neck pain is usually unilateral at first, then spreads to the other side and can radiate to the ipsilateral jaw, ear, occiput, or chest. Other symptoms, such as dysphagia and breathing difficulties caused by airway blockage, are uncommon.

The thyroid gland is extremely painful, rigid, and swollen, which can be symmetrical or asymmetrical. Approximately half of affected adolescents and two-thirds of adults have widespread thyroid gland involvement. Thyroid nodules are seen in one-fourth of adult patients. The surrounding skin is occasionally warm and erythematous. Cervical lymphadenopathy is rare. During the early stages of the condition, almost half of patients experience thyrotoxic symptoms such as anxiety, tachycardia, palpitation, and weight loss.

The typical natural history of de Quervain thyroiditis has four phases, beginning with thyroid discomfort and thyrotoxicosis, followed by a brief euthyroid phase, temporary hypothyroid phase, and recovery euthyroid phase.

== Causes ==
De Quervain's thyroiditis has been linked to a variety of viral illnesses, including mumps, adenovirus, Epstein-Barr virus, cytomegalovirus, coxsackievirus, influenza, echovirus, and enterovirus.

Furthermore, the development of de Quervain's thyroiditis may have a hereditary component. About two thirds of patients with de Quervain's thyroiditis were found to have positive histocompatibility antigen (HLA) B35 results. Furthermore, it was found that identical twins who were heterozygous for the HLA B35 haplotype also developed de Quervain thyroiditis at the same time. Atypical cases of de Quervain thyroiditis have also been documented to have HLA B15/62 positivity, and summer or fall months are when de Quervain thyroiditis is more common in people who test positive for HLA B67.

== Mechanism ==
It's still unclear exactly what causes de Quervain thyroiditis. According to available data, it is not an autoimmune illness. Still, the most likely cause is a viral infection. One theory for the pathophysiology of virus-associated thyroiditis is that thyroid follicular cell destruction results from cytotoxic T cell identification of viral and cell antigens presented as a complex.

== Diagnosis ==
The most common methods for diagnosing de Quervain thyroiditis are clinical and test results. Elevations of C-reactive protein and erythrocyte sedimentation rate are laboratory features of the condition. While typically normal, the blood leukocyte count may be slightly increased. There may be anemia that is normochromic and normocytic. Thyroid function testing frequently reveals decreased thyroid stimulating hormone (TSH) and increased serum levels of triiodothyronine (T3) and thyroxine (T4) during the acute phase of the disease. The intrathyroidal T3 and T4 levels are often reflected by the T3 to T4 ratio, which is typically less than 20 (ng/dL divided by μg/dL). Nearly all patients have increased serum thyroglobulin, which is consistent with follicular destruction.

=== Histopathology ===
Microscopic evaluation reveals characteristic stage-dependent and patchy follicular changes throughout the thyroid gland. In the early acute phase, thyroid follicular cells are disrupted and replaced by microabscesses and neutrophil infiltrates. As the disease progresses, classic granulomatous lesions form, characterized by aggregations of lymphocytes, plasma cells and large histiocytes surrounding colloid masses. Multinucleated giant cells coalesce around and internalize colloid fragments. In late stages, the tissue displays extensive lymphocytic infiltration and fibrosis. Under electron microscopy, subacute thyroiditis displays both granulomatous and non-granulomatous patchy lesions. Granulomatous lesions demonstrate a loss of the normal honeycomb cellular architecture of follicular cells, shortened microvilli and predominant giant cells. Non-granulomatous lesions feature disruption of the follicular basement membrane, which is replaced by T lymphocytes, monocytes and histiocytes.

Thyroid scans using technetium (99mTc) pertechnetate or RAIU usually show minimal uptake during the acute phase. This happens when thyroid follicles are disrupted, which impairs iodine trapping. Thyroid scan uptake increases throughout the recovery phase due to the thyroid gland's enhanced capacity to trap iodine, which eventually returns to normal after full recovery.

Thyroid gland enlargement and a region of hypoechogenicity that correlates to the inflammatory area are typically seen on thyroid ultrasonography. Low or normal vascular flow may be shown by color Doppler ultrasonography.

Rarely is tissue diagnosis required. Fine needle aspiration may be helpful in questionable cases, such as the area of pain restricted to a single nodule or confined area, to differentiate unilateral involvement from bleeding into a cyst or tumor.

== Treatment ==
The goals of treatment are to lessen hyperthyroid symptoms and relieve discomfort. Pain control only necessitates symptomatic treatment with non-steroidal anti-inflammatory medications or aspirin. Mild-to-Moderate pain managed with rest and oral nonsteroidal anti-inflammatory drugs (NSAIDs) or salicylates, such as salicylic acid (600 mg every 6 hours), naproxen (500–1000 mg twice daily) or ibuprofen (400–800 mg every 8 hours). Severely sick individuals may benefit from glucocorticoid medication, which often produces a substantial response in 24 to 48 hours. Severe pain treated with oral corticosteroids such as prednisone starting at 40 mg daily, which usually provides rapid relief within 1 to 2 days. Once pain is controlled, prednisone is titrated down by 5 to 10 mg weekly over approximately 2 months. Corticosteroid therapy does not prevent underlying thyroid dysfunction. Thyrotoxic symptoms are managed with beta-adrenergic blockers such atenolol and propranolol. Contraindicated medications include Thionamides (anti-thyroid drugs) and radioactive iodine therapy are ineffective and contraindicated for the hyperthyroid phase, as thyrotoxicosis is caused by the passive leak of pre-formed thyroid hormone from destroyed follicles rather than active hormone synthesis. Rarely, patients with serum TSH levels exceeding 10 microU/L or overt clinical symptoms require levothyroxine replacement for 1 to 2 months. Levothyroxine is then discontinued for 1 month followed by repeat thyroid function testing to determine if the hypothyroidism is transient or permanent.

== Differential diagnosis ==
The principal differential diagnoses for De Quervain's thyroiditis are acute infectious (suppurative) thyroiditis and a hemorrhagic thyroid nodule. Infectious thyroiditis is typically accompanied by marked leukocytosis, ultrasound evidence of an abscess and neutrophil-predominant fluid on fine-needle aspiration, whereas aspiration of a hemorrhagic nodule yields blood. Distinguishing De Quervain's thyroiditis from other thyroid conditions relies on specific clinical, laboratory and imaging findings:

Graves' Disease: Subacute thyroiditis lacks characteristic features of Graves' disease such as exophthalmos and pretibial myxedema.Serum T3 is only mildly elevated and color Doppler ultrasonography demonstrates decreased vascular flow (compared to the hypervascularity seen in Graves' disease).

Amiodarone-Induced Thyroiditis: Differentiated by urine iodine levels, which remain under 500 mcg/L in subacute thyroiditis.

Central Hypothyroidism: During the transition from the hyperthyroid to the hypothyroid phase, temporary concurrent low levels of both TSH and free T4 can occur, which may lead to a mistaken diagnosis of central hypothyroidism.

Other Entities: Additional differentials include painless thyroiditis, postpartum thyroiditis, radiation thyroiditis, checkpoint inhibitor-induced thyroiditis, palpation thyroiditis, painful Hashimoto thyroiditis, lymphoma and thyroid cancer.

== Complications ==
While De Quervain's thyroiditis is generally self-limiting, rare severe complications can occur:

Thyroid Storm / Thyrotoxic Crisis: Massive follicular destruction can occasionally precipitate a life-threatening thyroid storm.

Cardiovascular Complications: Excess circulating thyroid hormones can trigger incessant ventricular tachycardia.

Fever of Unknown Origin: Subacute thyroiditis can present as a fever of unknown origin during diagnostic workups.

Permanent Hypothyroidism: Although most patients return to a normal euthyroid state within 3 to 4 months, approximately 5% of patients develop permanent hypothyroidism requiring lifelong thyroid hormone replacement.

== Outlook ==
De Quervain thyroiditis is a self-limiting condition that often goes away without any problems in three to six months. Regardless of the severity of the disease or the type of treatment used, 20–56% of adult patients experienced transient hypothyroidism a few weeks after the hyperthyroid period. Though it only happens in 5–15% of cases, persistent hypothyroidism can develop years after the diagnosis. Recurrent de Quervain thyroiditis is rare, occurring in about 2% of cases, and usually manifests again within a year after diagnosis. But there have also been reports of late recurrences after several years.

== Epidemiology ==
Subacute or De Quervain thyroiditis is an unusual diagnosis, occurring in 12.1 out of 100,000 people annually. Children are rarely affected by the De Quervain thyroiditis. With a female-to-male ratio of 4–7:1, females are more likely to be impacted than males.

== History ==
De Quervain thyroiditis was originally reported in 1895 by Mygind. Fritz de Quervain distinguished this illness from other types of thyroiditis in 1904 based on a histological discovery, and de Quervain and Giordanengo confirmed the diagnosis in 1936.
