= Radiation-induced thyroiditis =

Radiation-induced thyroiditis is a form of painful, acute thyroiditis resulting from radioactive therapy to treat hyperthyroidism or from radiation to treat head and neck cancer or lymphoma. It affects 1% of those who have received radioactive iodine (I-131) therapy for Graves' Disease, typically presenting between 5 and 10 days after the procedure. Stored T_{3} and T_{4} are released as rapid destruction of thyroid tissue occurs which results in pain, tenderness, and exacerbation of hyperthyroidism.
