= Antithyroid autoantibodies =

Antibodies targeted against the thyroid

Antithyroid autoantibodies (or simply antithyroid antibodies) are autoantibodies targeted against one or more components on the thyroid. The most clinically relevant anti-thyroid autoantibodies are anti-thyroid peroxidase antibodies (anti-TPO antibodies, TPOAb), thyrotropin receptor antibodies (TRAb) and thyroglobulin antibodies (TgAb). TRAb's are subdivided into activating, blocking and neutral antibodies, depending on their effect on the TSH receptor. Anti-sodium/iodide (Anti–Na^{+}/I^{−}) symporter antibodies are a more recent discovery and their clinical relevance is still unknown. Graves' disease and Hashimoto's thyroiditis are commonly associated with the presence of anti-thyroid autoantibodies. Although there is overlap, anti-TPO antibodies are most commonly associated with Hashimoto's thyroiditis and activating TRAb's are most commonly associated with Graves' disease. Thyroid microsomal antibodies were a group of anti-thyroid antibodies; they were renamed after the identification of their target antigen (TPO).

== Subtypes ==
Anti-thyroid antibodies can be subdivided into groups according to their target antigen.

=== Anti-TPO antibodies ===
Anti-thyroid peroxidase (anti-TPO) antibodies are specific for the autoantigen TPO, an enzyme that catalyses iodine oxidation and thyroglobulin tyrosyl iodination reactions in the thyroid gland. Most antibodies produced are directed to conformational epitopes of the immunogenic carboxyl-terminal region of the TPO protein, although antibodies to linear epitopes have been seen. Anti-TPO antibodies are the most common anti-thyroid autoantibody, present in approximately 90% of Hashimoto's thyroiditis, 75% of Graves' disease and 10–20% of nodular goiter or thyroid carcinoma. Also, 10–15% of normal individuals can have high level anti-TPO antibody titres. High serum antibodies are found in active phase chronic autoimmune thyroiditis. Thus, an antibody titer can be used to assess disease activity in patients that have developed such antibodies. The majority of anti-TPO antibodies are produced by thyroid infiltrating lymphocytes, with minor contributions from lymph nodes and the bone marrow. They cause thyroid cell damage by complement activation and antibody dependent cell cytotoxicity. However, anti-TPO antibodies are not believed to contribute to the destruction of the thyroid.

=== TSH receptor antibodies ===
The thyrotropin receptor (TSH receptor) is the antigen for TSH receptor antibodies (TRAbs). It is a seven transmembrane G protein-coupled receptor that is involved in thyroid hormone signalling. TRAbs are grouped depending on their effects on receptor signalling; activating antibodies (associated with hyperthyroidism), blocking antibodies (associated with thyroiditis) and neutral antibodies (no effect on receptor). Activating and blocking antibodies mostly bind to conformational epitopes, whereas neutral antibodies bind to linear epitopes. Binding of the antibody to the amino terminus of the TSH receptor shows stimulatory activity, whereas binding to residues 261-370 or 388-403 block the activity. TRAbs are present in 70–100% of Graves' disease (85–100% for activating antibodies and 75–96% for blocking antibodies) and 1–2% of normal individuals.

Activating TRAbs are characteristic of Graves' disease (autoimmune hyperthyroidism). TPO antibody is measured more easily than the TSH receptor antibody, and so is often used as a surrogate in the diagnosis of Graves' disease. These antibodies activate adenylate cyclase by binding to the TSH receptor. This causes the production of thyroid hormones and subsequent growth and vascularisation of the thyroid. TRAbs are also useful in the diagnosis of Graves' ophthalmopathy. Although the exact mechanism of how TRAbs induce Graves' ophthalmopathy is unknown, it is likely that the antibodies bind to TSH receptors in retro-orbital tissues, causing infiltration of lymphocytes. This inflammatory response leads to cytokine production that causes fibroblasts to produce glycosaminoglycans, leading to ophthalmopathy.

Blocking TRAbs (also known as thyrotropin binding inhibitory immunoglobulins (TBII)) competitively block the activity of TSH on the receptor. This can cause hypothyroidism by reducing the thyrotropic effects of TSH. They are found in Hashimoto's thyroiditis and Graves' disease and may be cause of fluctuation of thyroid function in the latter. During treatment of Graves' disease they may also become the predominant antibody, which can cause hypothyroidism.

The clinical and physiological relevance of neutral antibodies remains unclear. However, they may be involved in prolonging the TSH receptor half-life.

=== Thyroglobulin (TG) antibodies ===
Thyroglobulin antibodies are specific for thyroglobulin, a 660 kDa matrix protein involved in the process of thyroid hormone production. They are found in 70% of Hashimoto's thyroiditis, 60% of idiopathic hypothyroidism, 30% of Graves' disease, a small proportion of thyroid carcinoma and 3% of normal individuals. Anti-TPO antibodies are present in 99% of cases where thyroglobulin antibodies are present, however only 35% of anti-TPO antibody positive cases also demonstrate thyroglobulin antibodies.

=== Anti–Na^{+}/ I^{−} symporter ===
Anti-Na^{+}/I^{−} symporter antibodies are a more recent discovery of possible thyroid autoantibodies and their role in thyroid disease remains uncertain. They are present in approximately 20% of Graves' disease and 24% of Hashimoto's thyroiditis.

== Pathogenesis ==
The production of antibodies in Graves' disease is thought to arise by activation of CD4+ T-cells, followed by B-cell recruitment into the thyroid. These B-cells produce antibodies specific to the thyroid antigens. In Hashimoto's thyroiditis, activated CD4+ T-cells produce interferon-γ, causing the thyroid cells to display MHC class II molecules. This expands the autoreactive T-cell repertoire and prolongs the inflammatory response.

While anti-thyroid antibodies are used to track the presence of autoimmune thyroiditis, they are generally not considered to contribute directly to the destruction of the thyroid.

== Effect on human reproduction ==
The presence of anti-thyroid antibodies is associated with an increased risk of unexplained subfertility (odds ratio 1.5 and 95% confidence interval 1.1–2.0), miscarriage (odds ratio 3.73, 95% confidence interval 1.8–7.6), recurrent miscarriage (odds ratio 2.3, 95% confidence interval 1.5–3.5), preterm birth (odds ratio 1.9, 95% confidence interval 1.1–3.5) and maternal postpartum thyroiditis (odds ratio 11.5, 95% confidence interval 5.6–24).

== History ==
In 1912 Hakaru Hashimoto described hypothyroidism and goiter associated with thyroid lymphoid infiltration. In 1956 the anti-Tg antibody was detected in similar cases, elucidating the autoimmune cause of these characteristics. Later the same year, activating TSH receptor antibodies were discovered. Thyroid microsomal antibodies were discovered in 1964, which were subsequently renamed anti-TPO antibodies due to the identification of their autoantigen.
