= Thyroiditis =

Inflammation of the thyroid gland

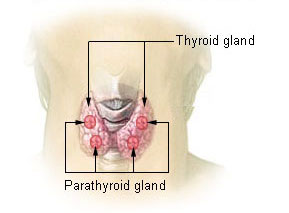
- The thyroid gland shown with the parathyroid glands on the front of a human neck.
- Specialty: Endocrinology

Thyroiditis is the inflammation of the thyroid gland. The thyroid gland is located on the front of the neck below the laryngeal prominence, and makes hormones that control metabolism.

Thyroiditis is a group of disorders that all cause thyroidal inflammation. Signs, symptoms, diagnosis, and treatment depend on the cause of thyroiditis. Forms of thyroiditis are Hashimoto's thyroiditis, postpartum thyroiditis, subacute (de Quervain's) thyroiditis, silent thyroiditis, drug-induced thyroiditis, radiation-induced thyroiditis and acute thyroiditis.

== Types ==
Hashimoto's thyroiditis is an autoimmune disease where the body creates thyroid antibodies. It presents with hypothyroidism due to the destruction of thyroid cells. In Hashimoto's thyroiditis, the hypothyroidism is most often permanent, with symptoms including fatigue, weight gain, depression, dry skin, and constipation. Thyroid hormone replacement is the treatment of hypothyroidism.

Silent thyroiditis or painless thyroiditis, also called subacute lymphocytic thyroiditis, is a form of subacute thyroiditis with a self-limiting course of temporary hyperthyroidism followed by temporary hypothyroidism before return to normal thyroid function within months. Elevated levels of thyroid hormones in the bloodstream, called hyperthyroidism, are seen in thyroiditis due to leakage of thyroid hormones from damaged thyroid cells into the bloodstream. Symptoms of hyperthyroidism include weight loss, irritability, anxiety, insomnia, fast heart rate, and fatigue.

Postpartum thyroiditis is when silent thyroiditis occurs within 6 months after delivery (postpartum).

de Quervain's thyroiditis, also called subacute granulomatous thyroiditis, is a form of subacute thyroiditis presenting with a painful thyroid and a self-limiting course of temporary hyperthyroidism followed by temporary hypothyroidism before returning to normal thyroid function within months. It is possibly caused by a viral infection.

Drug-induced thyroiditis may be caused by some drugs, such as lithium, amiodarone-induced thyrotoxicosis, interferon treatment, and immune checkpoint inhibitors, and resolves after discontinuation of the drug.

Radiation-induced thyroiditis occurs after treatment with radioactive iodine therapy or radiation therapy of the thyroid area and often results in permanent hypothyroidism.

Acute thyroiditis, or suppurative thyroiditis, is a rare form of infectious thyroiditis most often caused by bacteria, which may cause severe illness.

Riedel's thyroiditis, inflammation in which the thyroid tissue is replaced by fibrous tissue, which can extend to neighbouring structures, is associated with IgG4-related systemic disease in which symptoms of autoimmune pancreatitis, retroperitoneal fibrosis, and noninfectious inflammation of the aorta also occur.

== Epidemiology ==
Most types of thyroiditis are three to five times more likely to be found in women than in men. The average age of onset is between 30 and 50 years.
