= Myxedema psychosis =

- Other names: Myxedematous psychosis; Myxedema madness
- Pronunciation: Mik-suh-DEE-muh; sy-KOH-sis
- Specialty: Endocrinology
- Symptoms: Thought disorder, psychosis, delusions, hallucinations, hypothyroidism
- Complications: Long term cognitive impairment
- Usual onset: Can occur after weeks to months of poorly managed hypothyroidism
- Duration: Varies significantly
- Causes: Severe endocrinopathy, such as hypothyroidism, although rarely may be present in subclinical hypothyroid patients
- Risk factors: Autoimmune thyroiditis (Hashimoto's disease), postpartum and subacute thyroiditis, coexisting cardiovascular disease, polypharmacy, surgical stress or infection, delayed thyroid hormone administration, irregular levothyroxine adherence, severe iodine deficiency, malnutrition
- Diagnostic method: Thyroid function tests (TSH, T3, T4) and clinical evaluation based on hallmark symptoms such as marked bradyphrenia, hypothermia, non-pitting edema, and new onset psychosis
- Differential diagnosis: Primary psychotic disorder, illicit drug use, traumatic head injury, thyrotoxicosis, encephalitis, porphyria, sexually transmitted diseases
- Prevention: Thyroid hormone replacement therapy, regular thyroid function tests, screening for thyroid dysfunction
- Treatment: Thyroid hormone replacement therapy, supportive care, low-dose antipsychotics
- Prognosis: May vary significantly based on the underlying condition and the individual's response to treatment. Over 80% of patients achieve complete remission with early identification and appropriate treatment
- Frequency: The prevalence of myxedema psychosis is unknown. According to some estimates, approximately 5-15% of myxedematous patients exhibit psychosis
- Deaths: Unknown - myxedema coma, a related condition, has a mortality rate of 25-50%

Myxedema psychosis is a relatively uncommon consequence of untreated hypothyroidism, such as in Hashimoto's thyroiditis or in patients who have had the thyroid surgically removed and are not taking thyroxine. A chronically under-active thyroid can lead to slowly progressive dementia, delirium, and in extreme cases to hallucinations, coma, or psychosis, particularly in the elderly. The prevalence of myxedema psychosis is unknown. Myxedema coma, a related condition, affects an approximate 0.22 per 100,000 per year. According to some research, 5-15% of myxedematous patients have some form of psychosis. It is diagnosed through the measurement of thyroid stimulating hormone and treated by application of L-thyroxine. With treatment, over 80% of patients achieve complete remission of psychosis.

== Signs and symptoms ==
A patient with myxedema psychosis may present with symptoms of a thought disorder, such as delusions, visual and auditory hallucinations, perseveration, loose associations, and paranoia.

Alongside psychotic symptoms, the patient will usually present with severe hypothyroidism. Hypothyroid symptoms may include:

- Fatigue
- Cold sensitivity
- Constipation
- Dry skin
- Goitre
- Hoarseness
- Coarse, thinning hair
- Muscle weakness
- Bradycardia (slow heart rate)
- Depression
- Problems with memory.

Symptoms of myxedema may include:

- Low systolic and high diastolic blood pressure
- Respiratory depression
- Hypothermia
- Hyponatremia (low sodium content in blood)
- Shock
- Hypoxemia (low oxygen levels in blood)
- Hypercapnia (high carbon dioxide levels in blood)
- Coma
- Seizures
- Respiratory failure
- Death.

== History ==
The condition was first described in 1888 by the Committee of the Clinical Society of London, appointed in 1883 to research myxedema. The Committee had reported delusions and hallucinations in nearly half of the cases they investigated, with insanity as a complication, presenting as "acute or chronic manias, dementia, or melancholia, with a marked predominance of suspicion and self accusation."

Henry F. Stoll had described six individuals with "chronic invalidism with marked personality changes due to myxedema" in November 1932. In 1944, Hermann Zondek and Dr. Gerda Wolfsohn published a solitary case of psychosis occurring alongside myxedema. Author A. J. Cronin wrote an account in 1937 describing "mad myxedema."

"Myxoedematous madness" was introduced in 1949 by senior physician Richard Asher in his paper published to the British Journal of Medicine. Asher had described fourteen cases of patients who had myxedema with co-occurring psychotic symptoms, in which nine had a "dramatic recovery" upon administration of thyroid hormone treatment. He postulated that, because myxedema psychosis closely resembled other conditions such as paranoia, schizophrenia, melancholia, and mania, myxedema psychosis may be underdiagnosed and that symptoms of psychosis may be due to an underlying organic disease, rather than a primary psychiatric disorder.

Dr. Leonard Simpson had also described the condition in a publication of Price's Medicine.

== See also ==
- Hashimoto's encephalopathy
- Myxedema
- Myxedema coma
- Hypothyroidism
- Hashimoto's disease
