= Desiccated thyroid extract =

Thyroid gland prepared for medical use

Combination of
- Thyroxine: Thyroid hormone
- Triiodothyronine: Thyroid hormone

Clinical data
- Trade names: Armour Thyroid, NP Thyroid, Nature-Throid
- Other names: Natural thyroid, natural thyroid hormones, pork thyroid, thyroid USP, thyroid BP
- AHFS/Drugs.com: Monograph
- License data: US DailyMed: Thyroid porcine
- Routes of administration: By mouth
- ATC code: None

Legal status
- Legal status: US: ℞-only

Identifiers
- CAS Number: 8001-24-9

Desiccated thyroid extract (DTE), is thyroid gland that has been dried and powdered for medical use. It is used to treat hypothyroidism, but less preferred than levothyroxine. It is taken by mouth. Maximal effects may take up to three weeks to occur.

Side effects may occur from excessive doses. This may include weight loss, fever, headache, anxiety, trouble sleeping, arrhythmias, and heart failure. Other side effects may include allergic reactions. Use in pregnancy and breastfeeding is generally safe. Regular blood tests are recommended to verify the appropriateness of the dose. They contain a mixture of thyroxine (T4) and triiodothyronine (T3).

Desiccated thyroid has been used since the late 1800s. It is usually made from pigs, sheep, or cows. It is available as a generic medication. In 2023, it was the 141st most commonly prescribed medication in the United States, with more than 3 million prescriptions. Usage has decreased since the 1960s.

== Medical uses ==
The American Association of Clinical Endocrinologists and the Royal College of Physicians recommend against the use of thyroid extract for the treatment of hypothyroidism. Concerns include the potential for adverse effects from superphysiological levels of T3 and the absence of long-term safety data from randomized clinical trials. They recommend levothyroxine as the preferred treatment. Some practitioners refuse to use desiccated thyroid.

Each 64.8 mg (one grain) of thyroid extract contains approximately 38 μg and 9 μg of measurable levothyroxine (T4) and liothyronine (T3), respectively.

Arguments against desiccated thyroid include:

1. Desiccated thyroid preparations have a greater variability from batch to batch than synthetic ones.
2. Desiccated thyroid has roughly a 4:1 ratio of thyroxine (T4) to triiodothyronine (T3). In humans, the ratio is 11:1.
3. A combination of various ratios of T4 and T3 might not provide benefits over T4 alone. Some controlled trials have shown inconsistent benefits of various ratios of T4 and T3.
4. The use of desiccated thyroid is usually accompanied with the practice of dosing according to symptoms instead of dosing to achieve "ideal" lab results (e.g. serum levels of TSH). While there is debate as to what the ideal serum levels are, dosing according to symptoms often results in higher dosages. Most endocrinologists are opposed to these higher dosages as there is a risk of worsening osteoporosis with hyperthyroidism.
5. The preference for "natural" treatment seems to stem from philosophical belief as opposed to science.

Arguments for desiccated thyroid include:

1. Desiccated thyroid contains all the hormones produced by the thyroid gland, including calcitonin.
2. Desiccated thyroid therapy can be combined with synthetic thyroxine (T4) to balance out the T4/T3 ratio correctly.
3. While elements like T2 and calcitonin been tested and found in thyroid hormone, they have not been included in synthetic levothyroxine or synthetic T3. Patients who feel better when taking desiccated thyroid medication may not be able to synthesize these missing elements, and do not benefit from synthetic formulations that do not include them.
4. In practice worldwide patients prefer treatment with desiccated thyroid over synthetic T4 and T3 preparations. They feel better and are able to function more efficiently despite blood levels in the currently accepted range.

== Chemistry ==
Desiccated thyroid has been described in the United States Pharmacopoeia for a century as "the cleaned, dried, and powdered thyroid gland previously deprived of connective tissue and fat... obtained from domesticated animals that are used for food by man" (USP XVI). In the last few decades, pork alone is the usual source. Before modern assays, the potency was specified only by iodine content ("not less than 0.17% and not more than 0.23%"), rather than hormonal content or activity.

== History ==
The earliest oral treatment for hypothyroidism consisted of thyroid extract. George Redmayne Murray of the United Kingdom first described treatment of myxedema with thyroid extract in 1891, and published a description of long-term successful treatment (28 years) of a patient with myxedema (severe hypothyroidism) in 1920 His treatment was quickly adopted in North America and Europe. The first recorded American use dates to 1891 by a woman who was still taking it 52 years later at 84 years of age

Desiccated thyroid extract is prepared from pig thyroid glands. The glands are dried (desiccated), ground to powder, combined with binder chemicals, and pressed into pills. This was a new use for parts that were previously unwanted slaughterhouse offal, and Armour and Company, the dominant American meatpacker in the 20th century, supplied the best-known brand of thyroid extract.

Replacement by thyroid extract in hypothyroidism was one of the most effective treatments of any disease available to physicians before the middle of the 20th century, and in severe cases afforded dramatic relief of the myriad symptoms. The decision to treat was usually based on the presence of signs and symptoms of hypothyroidism because there were no accurate, readily available laboratory tests of thyroid function. Many less severe cases of hypothyroidism went untreated. Dosage was regulated by improvement of symptoms.

Desiccated thyroid became a commercial treatment option in 1934 with Westhroid,. In the early 1960s, desiccated thyroid hormones (thyroid extract) began to be replaced by levothyroxine (synthetic T4), or by combinations of T4 and T3. Replacement occurred faster in the United Kingdom than in North America, but by the 1980s more patients were being prescribed synthetic T4 (levothyroxine) or synthetic T4/T3 combinations than desiccated thyroid extract.

Several reasons have been identified as to why prescriptions changed from desiccated thyroid treatment.

- Although thyroid extract was useful and usually effective, some patients continued to complain of fatigue, weight gain, or other symptoms. Dosing until the 1960s was often a matter of prolonged adjustment trials.
- It was known that not all of the iodine content of thyroid extract was in the form of effective T4 and T3 and that actual content of available preparations varied more than the permitted 15%. It was hoped that better dosing precision with levothyroxine (synthetic) alone would increase the proportion of patients effectively treated. In 1980, a widely publicized investigation published in JAMA revealed continued large ranges of hormone content and potency in all of the available thyroid extracts on the American market.
- By the 1960s, it was known that thyroxine was the essential hormone produced by the thyroid gland, and that most T3 was manufactured in other parts of the body by deiodination of thyroxine. It was demonstrated in hypothyroid animals and people that replacement of thyroxine alone corrected the measurable manifestations (laboratory test results) of hypothyroidism. By the 1970s doctors could measure T4, T3, and TSH in human blood with approximate accuracy and confirmed that treatment with thyroxine alone could produce normal blood levels of both T4 and T3, but desiccated thyroid caused supraphysiologic levels of T3. In the majority of patients normalization of these levels eliminated all signs and symptoms of hypothyroidism.
- It was discovered that a healthy person varied the amount of T3 produced from T4 in response to changing needs and conditions and it seemed wiser not to bypass this control system by providing larger amounts of T3 than were naturally produced each day.
- Furthermore, when T3 could be measured, it was discovered that thyroid extract and synthetic combinations of T4 and T3 produced significantly greater fluctuations of T3 throughout the day than occurred in healthy people or hypothyroid people treated with thyroxine alone.
- Endocrinologists found that treatment with thyroxine alone worked as well or better than thyroid extract for the majority of patients, although even thyroxine did not reverse all the symptoms of a minority.

Thyroid care changed in other ways as well. Accurate T4 and T3 measurements became widely used in the 1970s, and by the late 1980s, TSH measurement had become sensitive enough to detect mild degrees of hyperthyroidism and overtreatment. Blood levels of thyroid hormones and TSH were found to be the best predictors of objective benefits from thyroid replacement: those with the most severe measurable deficiency enjoyed the most dramatic and sustained benefits. It was also discovered that even mild hyperthyroidism as defined by a suppressed TSH level, whether due to disease or overtreatment, was associated with poorer bone density (i.e., osteopenia) in women, and with higher rates of atrial fibrillation in elderly patients.

== Society and culture ==
=== Names ===
This product is sometimes referred to as thyroid USP, thyroid BP. Brands differ only in binders and fillers.
