= Nontoxic multinodular goitre =

- Other names: Nonactive multinodular goitre, inactive multinodular goitre
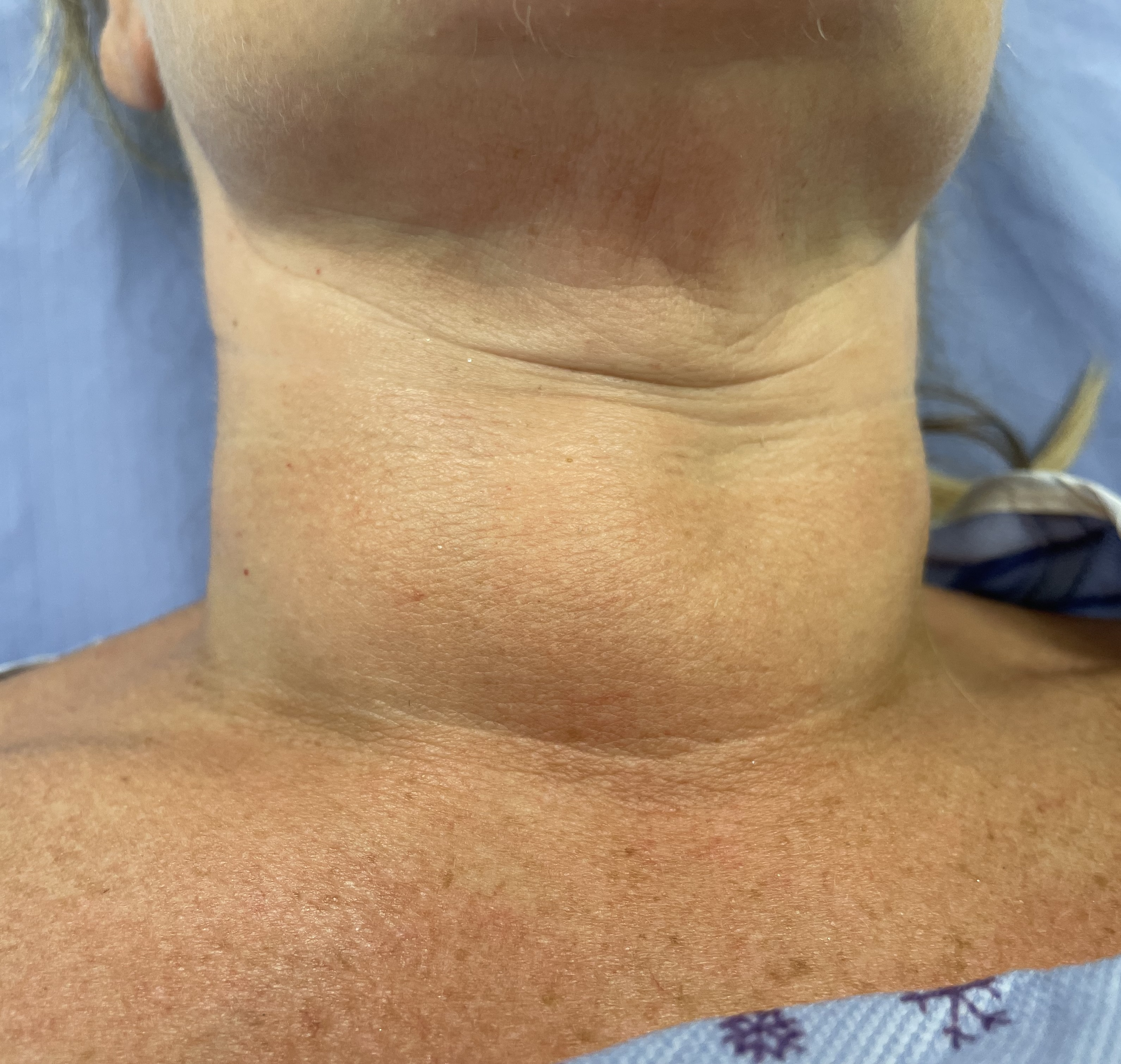
- Enlarged neck swelling that represents a goiter
- Specialty: Endocrinology
- Symptoms: Neck swelling, compressive symptoms of neck (difficulty breathing, difficulty swallowing, voice changes)
- Causes: Iodine deficiency most common
- Risk factors: Increasing age, female sex, lower socioeconomic status, genetics, smoking
- Diagnostic method: Physical exam, thyroid function tests, ultrasound
- Differential diagnosis: Toxic multinodular goitre, thyroid cancer, inflammatory thyroid disease

Nontoxic multinodular goitre, also known as an inactive multinodular goitre, is an enlargement of the thyroid gland, which develops multiple nodules without affecting thyroid hormone function. In the United States it is the most common cause of an enlarged thyroid, affecting between 3–5% of the population. It often is asymptomatic but can present with painless swelling of the neck. Large goitres can present with difficulty swallowing, difficulty breathing, or voice changes from compressing nearby structures in the neck. The most common cause of nontoxic multinodular goitre is iodine deficiency, with risk factors including older age, female sex, and exposure to radiation. Management typically involves observation unless the goitre grows rapidly, causes compressive symptoms, or is concerning for cancer. In these cases, treatment can include surgery, radioactive iodine, or thyroid hormone suppression.

== Etiology ==
Iodine deficiency is the most common cause of nontoxic multinodular goitre. Risk factors include increasing age, female sex, lower socioeconomic status, genetics, and smoking. In terms of genetic susceptibility, one study identified a linkage between mulitnodular goiter-1 (MNG-1) locus on chromosome 14q and familial euthyroid multinodular goitre. Other causes of nontoxic multinodular goitre include the following:

- Hormonal changes during puberty and pregnancy can lead to a temporary goitre.
- Radiation exposure.
- Infections.
- Inflammatory conditions, such as granulomatous diseases.

== History and physical exam findings ==
Nontoxic multinodular goitre is often asymptomatic. However, when symptoms are present, they may include painless nodular swelling of the neck that moves with swallowing. If the goitre is large enough to compress nearby structures in the neck, such as the esophagus, trachea, or recurrent laryngeal nerve, it may present with difficulty swallowing, difficulty breathing, or voice changes, respectively. Additionally, raising both arms above the head may produce shortness of breath or facial congestion. This is known as Pemberton's sign.

== Diagnosis ==
=== Evaluation ===
A goitre is initially evaluated with physical exam findings and thyroid function tests, which include thyroid-stimulating hormone (TSH), free T_{4}, and free T_{3} levels. Ultrasound should also be completed to evaluate the size and quantity of nodules, their echogenicity, the presence of calcifications, and vascularity. Fine-needle aspiration (FNA) with ultrasound guidance isn’t typically necessary unless the ultrasound has findings concerning for thyroid cancer, such as hypoechogenicity, evidence of calcification, increased vascularity, or solid areas within a complex nodule.

=== Diagnosis ===
In nontoxic multinodular goiter, TSH levels are typically normal (euthyroid).

=== Differential diagnosis ===
Nontoxic multinodular goitre is often present for years before it may develop into a toxic multinodular goitre. It is differentiated from toxic multinodular goitre based on normal thyroid hormone levels. In comparison, thyroid hormone levels are increased in toxic multinodular goitre since the thyroid functions independently of TSH production, which leads to hyperthyroidism.

There should be further evaluation for thyroid malignancy with FNA if cervical lymphadenopathy or suspicious ultrasound findings is seen in association with a rapidly growing nodular goiter on physical exam. Thyroid malignancy can include papillary, follicular, and medullary thyroid cancer, and thyroid lymphoma.

Causes of inflammatory goiter should also be ruled out, such as Hashimoto's thyroiditis, De Quervain's thyroiditis, and Riedel's thyroiditis.

== Treatment ==
Nontoxic multinodular goitre can usually be observed with regular follow up. However, some patients may benefit from thyroid hormone replacement if TSH is elevated. Radioiodine therapy and iodine supplementation can decrease the size of the goitre.

Surgical intervention can be considered if non-surgical management was ineffective, such as if the goitre continues to enlarge to the point where it compresses surrounding structures in the neck, such as the esophagus, trachea, and recurrent laryngeal nerve. Symptoms include difficulty swallowing, difficulty breathing, and/or voice changes. Surgical treatment can also be indicated if there is concern for cancer. Surgical management can include complete thyroid removal (total thyroidectomy) or partial thyroid removal (subtotal thyroidectomy). A systematic review comparing total and subtotal thyroidectomy revealed that there is minimal evidence that favors one approach over the other. Reported complications of a total thyroidectomy can include low calcium levels due to post-surgical hypoparathyroidism and injury to the recurrent laryngeal nerve, which can lead to voice changes.
