= ButcherBox (company) =

American meat delivery company

ButcherBox is an American subscription-based meat delivery company launched in 2015 by Mike Salguero that ships boxes of frozen grass-fed beef, free-range organic chicken, and heritage breed pork to subscribers in the United States. The company sells meats raised without antibiotics or added hormones, offers 21 cuts of meat in monthly subscription boxes priced from $129 to $270 depending on quantity, and ships products in 100 percent curbside-recyclable boxes made of 95 percent recycled materials; it emphasizes partnerships with vendors using sustainable and humane practices and fair labor standards.

== History ==
ButcherBox was founded in 2015, with Mike Salguero coming up with the idea after he started supporting his wife suffering from Hashimoto's syndrome by ordering cleaner meat prescribed by doctors and nutritionists to combat her symptoms.

ButcherBox collaborates with third-party organizations such as the Global Animal Partnership (GAP)and the American Society for the Prevention of Cruelty to Animals. The company holds a B Corporation Certification. ButcherBox is the only B-Corp Certified meat and seafood company to source only from partners with third-party animal welfare certifications.

In May 2024, ButcherBox acquired Truffle Shuffle.

Since its launch, ButcherBox has reported over $550 million in sales, growing to $600 million by 2025.
