= Advanz Pharma =

British pharmaceutical company

- Company type: Private company
- Traded as: TSX: ADVZ
- Industry: Pharmaceutical industry
- Founded: 1963
- Headquarters: London, United Kingdom
- Key people: Steffen Wagner (CEO)
- Products: Acetazolamide; Alitretinoin; Biperiden; Carbimazole; Chlortalidone; Digoxin; Ergotamine; Erythromycin; Flurbiprofen; Fusidic acid; Hydroxychloroquine; Levothyroxine; Liothyronine; Maprotiline; Nilutamide; Nitrofurantoin; Phenobarbital; Pilocarpine; Porfimer sodium; Terazosin; Zonisamide
- Revenue: ▲$537 million (2018)
- Website: www.advanzpharma.com

Advanz Pharma Corp. is a British multinational pharmaceutical company headquartered in London. It changed its name from Concordia Healthcare Corp. in November 2018. The company focuses on a number of therapy areas including endocrinology, ophthalmology, urology, anti-infectives, pain management, central nervous system disorders, oncology, haematology, cardiology and intensive care medicine. The company also focuses on acquiring legacy pharmaceutical compounds which are usually off-patent. The operational headquarters is in London, UK, the operations centre is in Mumbai, India and regional hubs are located in Europe, Australia, and Canada.

== History ==
=== 2013 ===
In May the company acquired pediatric products (Kapvay, Orapred ODT & OS) from Shionogi Inc. In October the company acquired Complete Medical Homecare, then in December the company completed the takeover of Mercari Acquisition Corp. as well as Pinnacle Biologics Inc., and began trading on the Toronto stock exchange.

=== 2014 ===
In January the company completed a five-year exclusive distribution deal with Lachlan Pharma Holdings to distribute Ulesfia in the United States. In March, the company entered into a definitive agreement to acquire the irritable bowel syndrome drug, Donnatal, from Revive Pharmaceuticals for $200 million and 4,605,833 common shares of company stock. The deal was completed in May. In September, the company entered into its first collaboration with Orphan Canada. In the same month, the company announced it would acquire Zonegran in the United States and Puerto Rico, for $90 million.

=== 2015 ===
In March the company announced its largest acquisition to date when it agreed to buy the majority of assets of Covis Pharma Sarl and Covis Injectables Sarl for $1.2 billion in cash. Concordia acquired eighteen drugs as part of the transaction and anticipated a 50% increase in earnings per share for the year.

In September, Concordia paid European private equity firm Cinven $3.5 billion in cash and shares for UK-based global out-of-patent prescription pharmaceuticals firm Amdipharm Mercury, abbreviated as AMCo. The deal would "uniquely position the combined company as a leading, international pharmaceutical company with extensive geographic reach", said Concordia chief executive Mark Thompson. For 2015, the company reported year-over-year revenue growth of $289 million (276% increase) and year-over-year adjusted EBITDA1 growth of $206 million (347% increase).

=== 2016 ===
In February 2016, CEO Mark Thompson transferred his entire stock holdings to an Ontario numbered company. In March, a special committee was set up within the company to evaluate suitors for a takeover. Each of the suitors was a private equity firm. The company was not sold and in October 2016, the company formally ended the special committee. During this time, CEO Mark Thompson, via shares backed collateral loan, saw his shares being sold on the public market during August, September and October.

On September 15, 2016, the British Parliament proposed a new bill, the "Health Service Medical Supplies (Costs) Bill". The bill addressed overcharging and members of Parliament specifically named AMCo. It was unanimously approved October 24, 2016.

On October 21, 2016, the company announced that Mark Thompson was stepping down as CEO and chairman of the board.

=== 2017 ===
The British Competition and Markets Authority launched an investigation into the alleged “excessive and unfair pricing” of liothyronine tablets in 2017. It alleged that the company overcharged the NHS from before 2007 to July 2017. The price of a pack increased by almost 6,000% from £4.46 before it was debranded in 2007 to £258.19 by July 2017.

=== 2019 ===
In January 2019 the Competition and Markets Authority altered its investigation period, saying that “the price paid by the NHS for liothyronine tablets rose from £15.15 to £258.19, a rise of 1,605%, while production costs remained broadly stable”. The company said that price increases were notified in advance and implemented only after approval from the Department of Health and Social Care.

=== 2020 ===
Effective January 1, 2020, Advanz Pharma moved from Canada to Jersey with headquarters in London. In March, ADVANZ PHARMA de-listed its shares from the Toronto Stock Exchange and the company acquired Correvio Pharma Corp. for US$76 million.

=== 2021 ===
In July 2021 the Competition and Markets Authority found that the company "exploited a loophole enabling it to reap much higher profits" and was directly fined £40.9m. It raised the price of liothyronine tablets from £6 a pack to £248 in 2017. Its former private equity owners HgCapital and Cinven, which now form part of the company, were also fined £8.6 million and £51.9 million respectively. The company's response was that they take "competition law very seriously. We utterly disagree with the CMA’s decision on the pricing of liothyronine tablets and will be appealing. In addition, any liothyronine price increases were all pre-notified to, and agreed in advance and in writing by, the Department of Health and Social Care.”

Cidron Aida Bidco, a subsidiary of Nordic Capital, acquired Advanz Pharma for "all issued and to-be-issued limited voting share capital" totaling $846m. Share holders will receive $17.26 in cash per share in accordance with the acquisition deal. This acquisition is expected to assist in the growth of Advanz Pharma by providing investment and capacities support.
