= Psychosis (disambiguation) =

Psychosis is a generic psychiatric term for a mental state characterized by loss of contact with reality.

Psychosis or psychotic may also refer to:

== Psychology and psychiatry ==
- Brief psychotic disorder, the Diagnostic and Statistical Manual of Mental Disorders, Fourth Edition, Text Revision (DSM-IV-TR) describes brief psychotic disorder based primarily on duration of symptoms. DSM-IV defines brief psychotic disorder as an illness lasting from 1 day to 1 month, with an eventual return to the premorbid level of functioning
  - Brief reactive psychosis, psychosis which can be triggered by an extremely stressful event in the life of a patient
- Manic-depressive psychosis in bipolar disorder, especially manic episodes, can include psychotic features
- Menstrual psychosis, abnormal behaviour linked to menstruation
- Mystical psychosis, a term coined to characterize first-person accounts of psychotic experiences that are strikingly similar to reports of mystical experiences
- Myxedema psychosis, a relatively uncommon consequence of hypothyroidism or patients who have had the thyroid surgically removed
- Occupational psychosis, the concept that one's occupation or career makes that person so biased that they could be described as psychotic
- Postpartum psychosis, a group of mental illnesses with the sudden onset of psychotic symptoms following childbirth
- Psychotic depression, a type of depression that can include symptoms and treatments that are different from those of non-psychotic major depressive disorder
- Shared psychosis, a psychiatric syndrome in which symptoms of a delusional belief are transmitted from one individual to another
- Stimulant psychosis, a psychotic disorder that appears in some people who abuse stimulant drugs
- Substance-induced psychosis, a form of substance-related disorder where psychosis can be attributed to substance use
- Tardive psychosis, a form of psychosis distinct from schizophrenia and induced by the use of current (dopaminergic) antipsychotics by the depletion of dopamine and related to the known side effect caused by their long-term use, tardive dyskinesia

== Music ==
- Psychosis (album), an album by Cavalera Conspiracy

=== Songs ===
- "Psychosis", a song by Hawkwind from their 1980 album Levitation
- "Psychosis", a song by Poets of the Fall from their 2008 album Revolution Roulette
- "Psychosis", a 1995 song by the Refreshments
- "Psychosis", a 1997 song by U.K. Subs

== Other uses ==
- Psychosis (film), a 2010 film
- Psychosis (journal), a peer-reviewed medical journal
- Psychosis (video game), a 1990 video game
- 4.48 Psychosis, a 1999 play by Sarah Kane

== See also ==
- Psicosis (born 1971), Mexican professional wrestler
- Psicosis II (born 1967), Mexican professional wrestler
- "Psychotic Reaction", a 1966 song by Count Five
