= Liothyronine =

Chemical compound

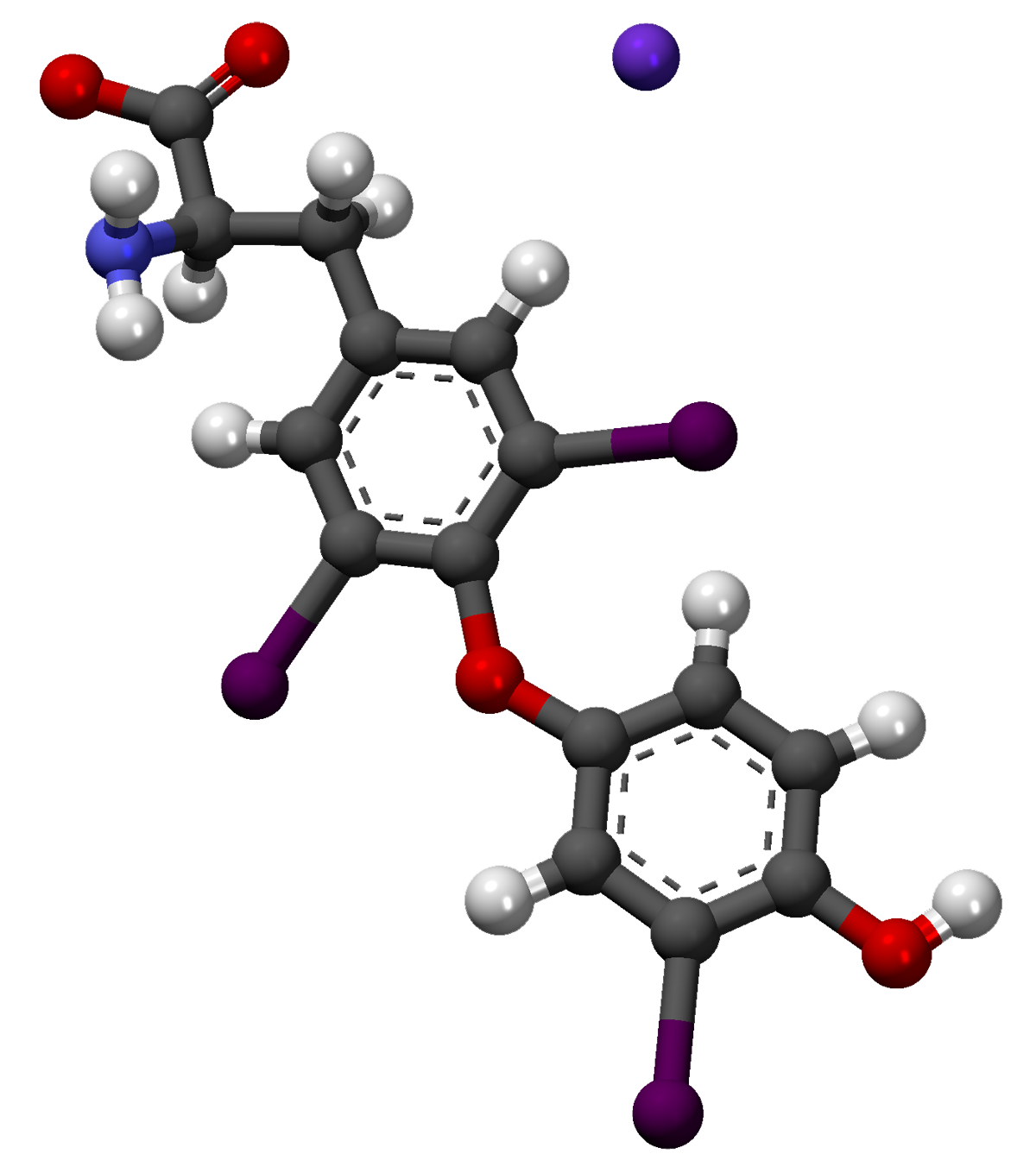

Clinical data
- Trade names: Cytomel, Tertroxin, others
- AHFS/Drugs.com: Monograph
- MedlinePlus: a682462
- License data: US DailyMed: Liothyronine
- Routes of administration: By mouth, intravenous
- ATC code: H03AA02 (WHO)

Legal status
- Legal status: CA: ℞-only; UK: POM (Prescription only)

Pharmacokinetic data
- Protein binding: 99.7%
- Elimination half-life: 2.5 days

Identifiers
- IUPAC name: (2S)-2-amino-3-[4-(4-hydroxy-3-iodophenoxy)-3,5-diiodophenyl]propanoic acid
- CAS Number: 6893-02-3
- PubChem CID: 5920
- IUPHAR/BPS: 2634
- DrugBank: DB00279
- ChemSpider: 5707
- UNII: 06LU7C9H1V
- KEGG: D08128
- ChEBI: CHEBI:18258
- ChEMBL: ChEMBL1544
- PDB ligand: T3 (PDBe, RCSB PDB)
- CompTox Dashboard (EPA): DTXSID8047505
- ECHA InfoCard: 100.000.203

Chemical and physical data
- Formula: C_{15}H_{12}I_{3}NO_{4}
- Molar mass: 650.977 g·mol^{−1}
- 3D model (JSmol): Interactive image
- SMILES: C1=CC(=C(C=C1OC2=C(C=C(C=C2I)C[C@@H](C(=O)O)N)I)I)O
- InChI: InChI=1S/C15H12I3NO4/c16-9-6-8(1-2-13(9)20)23-14-10(17)3-7(4-11(14)18)5-12(19)15(21)22/h1-4,6,12,20H,5,19H2,(H,21,22)/t12-/m0/s1; Key:AUYYCJSJGJYCDS-LBPRGKRZSA-N

Liothyronine is a manufactured form of the thyroid hormone triiodothyronine (T_{3}). It is most commonly used to treat hypothyroidism and myxedema coma. It can be taken by mouth or by injection into a vein.

Side effects may occur from excessive doses. This may include weight loss, fever, headache, anxiety, trouble sleeping, arrhythmias, and heart failure. Use in pregnancy and breastfeeding is generally safe.

Liothyronine was approved for medical use in 1956. It is available as a generic medication. In 2023, it was the 220th most commonly prescribed medication in the United States, with more than 1 million prescriptions.

== Medical uses ==
Liothyronine may be used when there is an impaired conversion of T_{4} to T_{3} in peripheral tissues. The dose of liothyronine for hypothyroidism is a lower amount than levothyroxine due it being a higher concentrated synthetic medication. About 25 μg of liothyronine is equivalent to 100 μg of levothyroxine.

In thyroid cancer or Graves' disease, ablation therapy with radioactive iodine (^{131}I) can be used to remove trace thyroid tissue that may remain after thyroidectomy (surgical excision of the gland). For ^{131}I therapy to be effective, the trace thyroid tissue must be avid to iodine, which is achieved by elevating the person's TSH levels. For patients taking levothyroxine, TSH may be boosted by discontinuing levothyroxine for 3–6 weeks. This long period of hormone withdrawal is required because of levothyroxine's relatively long biological half-life, and may result in symptoms of hypothyroidism in the patient. The shorter half-life of liothyronine permits a withdrawal period of two weeks, which may minimize hypothyroidism symptoms. One protocol is to discontinue levothyroxine, then prescribe liothyronine while the T_{4} levels are falling, and finally stop the liothyronine two weeks before the radioactive iodine treatment.

Liothyronine may also be used for myxedema coma because of its quicker onset of action when compared to levothyroxine. Use for the treatment of obesity is not recommended.

=== Depression ===
Adding liothyronine to tricyclic antidepressants appears useful, especially in women. An algorithm developed from the STAR*D trial recommends liothyronine as an option when people have failed two antidepressant medications.

=== Pregnancy ===
Thyroid hormone is minimally transferred to the fetus or placenta; however, as of October 2014, studies have not shown any adverse effects to the fetus. Hypothyroid mothers should continue to take thyroid hormone replacement therapy throughout pregnancy to avoid adverse events.

=== Nursing ===
Breastmilk contains a low amount of thyroid hormone, so it is important to exercise caution when breastfeeding while taking liothyronine.

=== Elderly ===
Older people should be started on lower doses of liothyronine. Plasma T_{3} concentrations in this population are decreased by 25% to 40%. TSH must be routinely monitored since there is a risk of coronary artery disease, hyperthyroidism and excessive bone loss from inadequate or abnormal thyroid replacement.

== Contraindications ==
Any person with a hypersensitivity to liothyronine sodium or any active ingredient of the formulation should not be on this medication. If there is uncorrected adrenal insufficiency or thyrotoxicosis, a different approach to therapy must be considered.

== Side effects ==
Liothyronine may cause a number of side effects, mostly similar to symptoms of hyperthyroidism. The principal (most common) side effects include:

- excessive sweating
- nervousness
- sensitivity to heat
- weight loss

Less common side effects include:

- changes in menstrual cycle
- diarrhea
- fever
- headache
- increased appetite
- insomnia
- irritability
- stomach cramps
- tremor
- upset stomach
- vomiting

=== Boxed warning ===
The package insert contains the following boxed warning, as do all thyroid hormones:

Drugs with thyroid hormone activity, alone or together with other therapeutic agents, have been used for the treatment of obesity. In euthyroid patients, doses within the range of daily hormonal requirements are ineffective for weight reduction. Larger doses may produce serious or even life-threatening manifestations of toxicity, particularly when given in association with sympathomimetic amines such as those used for their anorectic effects.

== Pharmacology ==
Liothyronine is the most potent form of thyroid hormone. Liothyronine sodium, a salt of triiodothyronine (T_{3}), is chemically similar and pharmacologically equivalent to T_{3}. As such, it acts on the body to increase the basal metabolic rate, affect protein synthesis and increase the body's sensitivity to catecholamines (such as adrenaline) by permissiveness. As monotherapy or in combination therapy with SSRIs, liothyronine may also enhance generation of new neurons in the central nervous system. The thyroid hormones are essential to proper development and differentiation of all cells of the human body. These hormones also regulate protein, fat, and carbohydrate metabolism, affecting how human cells use energetic compounds.

In comparison to levothyroxine (T_{4}), liothyronine has a faster onset of action as well as a shorter biological half-life, which may be due to less plasma protein binding to thyroxine-binding globulin and transthyretin.

== Society and culture ==
=== Economics ===
The British Competition and Markets Authority launched an investigation into the alleged "excessive and unfair pricing" of liothyronine tablets in 2017. It alleged that Advanz Pharma overcharged the NHS from before 2007 to July 2017. The price of a pack increased by almost 1,600% from £4.46 before it was debranded in 2007 to £258.19 by July 2017.
