= Hashitoxicosis =

Thyrotoxicosis in Hashimoto's thyroiditis

Hashitoxicosis, which can be abbreviated "Htx", is a transient hyperthyroidism caused by inflammation associated with Hashimoto's thyroiditis disturbing the thyroid follicles, resulting in excess release of thyroid hormone.

Major clinical signs include weight loss (often accompanied by an increased appetite), anxiety, intolerance to heat, fatigue, hair loss, weakness, hyperactivity, irritability, apathy, depression, polyuria, polydipsia, delirium, and sweating. Additionally, patients may present with a variety of symptoms such as palpitations and arrhythmias (notably atrial fibrillation), shortness of breath (dyspnea), loss of libido, nausea, vomiting, and diarrhea. Long term untreated hyperthyroidism can lead to osteoporosis. In the elderly, these classical symptoms may not be present.

== See also ==
- Hashimoto's thyroiditis
- thyroid hormone
- hyperthyroidism
