= George Redmayne Murray =

- Born: 20 June 1865; Newcastle upon Tyne, Northumberland, England
- Died: 21 September 1939 (aged 74); Mobberley, Cheshire, England
- Education: Eton College; Trinity College, Cambridge
- Known for: endocrine disorders
- Scientific career
- Fields: medicine

George Redmayne Murray (20 June 1865 – 21 September 1939) was an English physician who pioneered in the treatment of endocrine disorders. In 1891, he introduced the successful treatment of myxedema, with injections of sheep thyroid extract, the first instance of hormone replacement therapy.

Murray was educated at Eton and Trinity College, Cambridge. He was appointed Heath professor of comparative pathology at Durham University in 1893, and physician to the Royal Victoria Infirmary at Newcastle in 1898. In 1908 he was appointed professor of systematic medicine at Manchester University, which carried with it the post of physician to the Manchester Royal Infirmary.
