= Myxedema =

Extreme hypothyroidism

- Other names: Myxoedema
- Hyaluronan, an example of a mucopolysaccharide
- Specialty: Endocrinology

Myxedema (British English: myxoedema) is a term used synonymously with severe hypothyroidism, but also to describe a dermatological change that can occur in hypothyroidism and (rare) paradoxical cases of hyperthyroidism. In this latter sense, myxedema refers to deposition of glycosaminoglycans in the dermis, which results in swelling of the affected area. One manifestation of myxedema occurring in the lower limb is pretibial myxedema, a hallmark of Graves' disease, an autoimmune form of hyperthyroidism. Myxedema can also occur in Hashimoto thyroiditis and other long-standing forms of hypothyroidism.

== Signs and symptoms ==
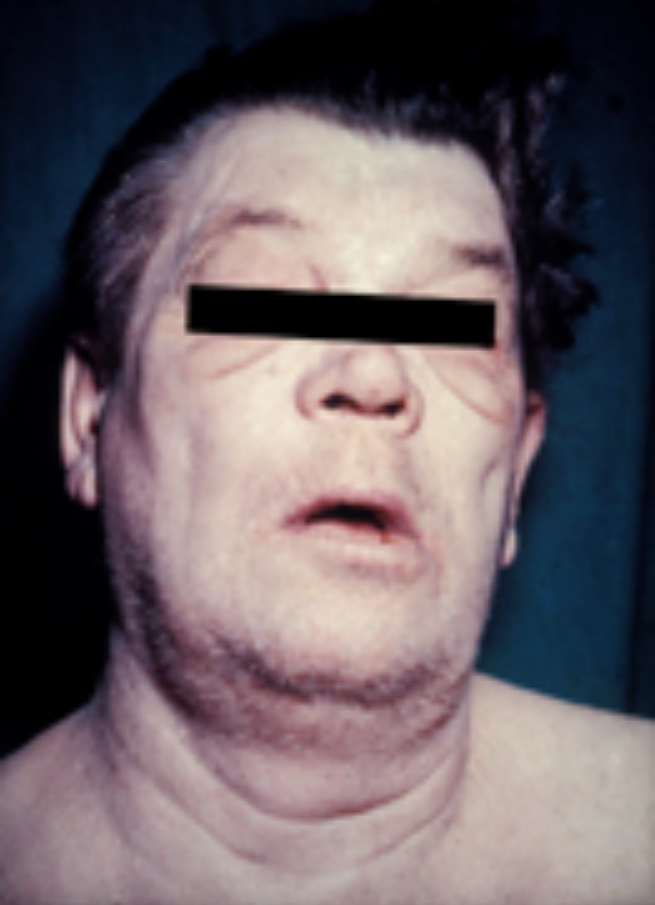
Man with myxedema or severe hypothyroidism showing an expressionless face, puffiness around the eyes and pallor

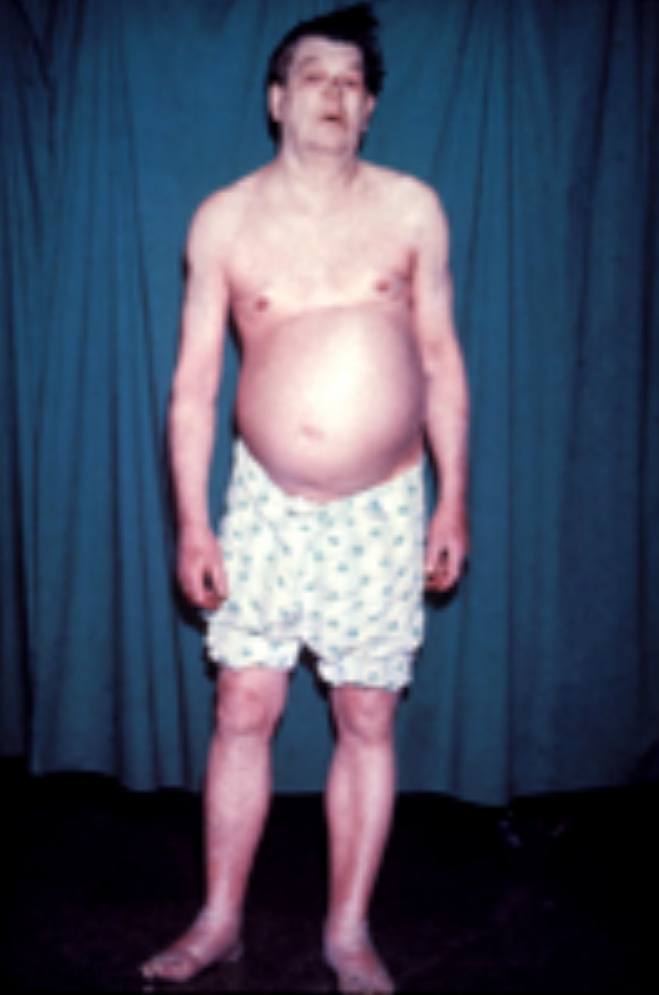
Additional findings include swelling of the arms and legs and significant ascites.

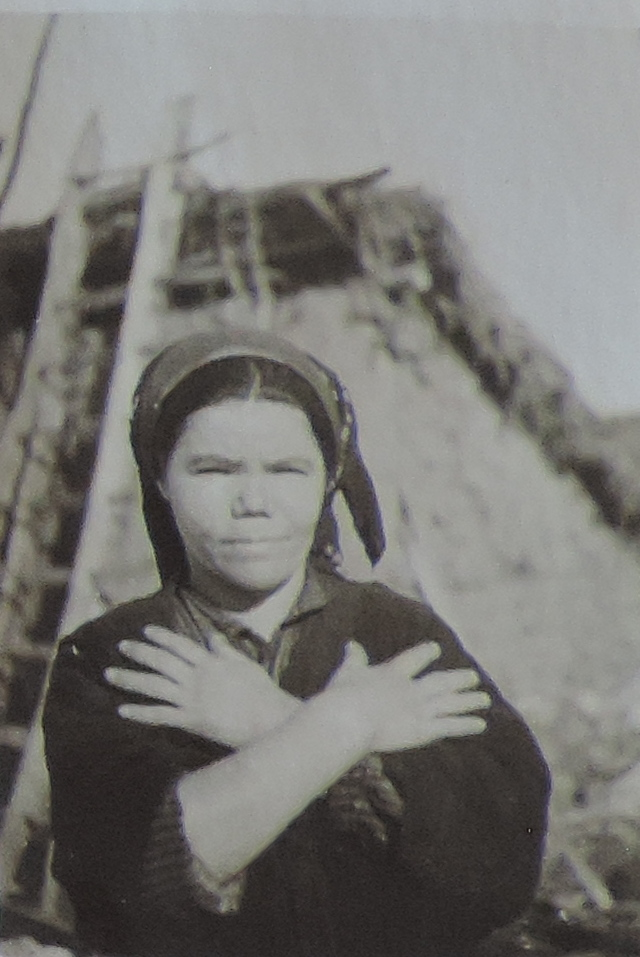
Woman with myxedema, Bulgaria, 1930s.

Myxedema's characteristic physical sign is non-pitting edema, in contrast to pitting edema.

Myxedema can also occur in the lower leg (pretibial myxedema) and behind the eyes (exophthalmos).

Severe cases, requiring hospitalization can exhibit signs of hypothermia, hypoglycemia, hypotension, respiratory depression, and coma.

== Causes ==
Myxedema is known to occur in various forms of hypothyroidism, as well as hyperthyroidism, including Graves' disease. One of the hallmarks of Graves' disease is pretibial myxedema, myxedema of the lower limb.

Myxedema is more common in women than in men.

Myxedema can occur in:

- Hyperthyroidism, associated with pretibial myxedema and exophthalmos. Pretibial myxedema can occur in 1–4% of patients with Graves' disease, a cause of hyperthyroidism.
- Hypothyroidism, including Hashimoto's thyroiditis.

== Pathophysiology ==
Myxedema describes a specific form of cutaneous and dermal edema secondary to increased deposition of connective tissue components. The connective fibres are separated by an increased amount of protein and glycosaminoglycans. This protein-mucopolysaccharide complex binds water, producing non-pitting boggy edema, in particular around eyes, hands, feet and in the supraclavicular fossae. This deposition involves not only the skin but also the tongue, myocardium, kidney medulla, lung, intestine and most other organs of the body (apart from the stomach). Myxoedema is also responsible for the thickening of the laryngeal and pharyngeal mucous membranes, which results in thick slurred speech and hoarseness, both of which are seen commonly in hypothyroidism.

The accumulation of glycosaminoglycans (GAGs) in the dermal tissues consists characteristically of hyaluronic acid with very little change in the dermatan sulfate abundance and perhaps a decrease in chondroitin sulfate. The tissue change in myxedema can be related directly to the physicochemical properties of hyaluronate. Its hygroscopic nature allows it to swell to one thousand times its dry weight when hydrated.

The pathogenesis of generalized myxedema is thought to be fairly well understood and related to the deficiency of thyroid hormone, but the pathogenesis of pretibial and orbital myxedema due to Graves' disease is not fully understood, however, two mechanisms predominate:

- Fibroblast stimulation. It is thought that fibroblast stimulation by the thyroid stimulating hormone (TSH) receptor increases the deposition of glycosaminoglycan, which results in an osmotic edema and fluid retention. It is thought that many cells responsible for forming connective tissue react to increases in TSH levels.
- Lymphocyte stimulation. In Graves' thyroid disease, lymphocytes react against the TSH receptor by inappropriately producing thyroid-stimulating immunoglobulin (IgG; type II hypersensitivity). Lymphocytes react not only against thyroid receptors, but also any tissue with cells expressing the receptor. This can lead to tissue damage and scar tissue formation, explaining the deposition of glycosaminoglycans.

== Diagnosis ==
It is often possible to diagnose myxedema on clinical grounds alone. Characteristic symptoms are weakness, cold intolerance, mental and physical slowness, dry skin, typical facies, and hoarse voice. Results of the total serum thyroxine and free thyroxine index tests usually will confirm the diagnosis.

== Management ==
Primary treatment is prompted by the administration of adequate doses of either the thyroid hormone L-thyroxine given intravenously or by giving liothyronine via a nasogastric tube. It is essential to identify and treat the condition precipitating the coma.

Myxedema coma is rare but often fatal. It occurs most often in elderly women and may be mistaken for one of the chronic debilitating diseases common to this age group.

Gabrilove et al demonstrated that histological skin changes can be observed within 3-4 weeks after initiating thyroid hormone replacement therapy with desiccated thyroid extract. This was documented through skin biopsies performed on individuals with hypothyroidism both before and after treatment. The magnitude of these effects was related to the dose of thyroid hormone administered, and the rate at which this occurred depended on the amounts of material present at the outset.

Though the exact cause of myxedema is still unclear, a wealth of research has demonstrated the importance of iodine. In an important study the researchers showed that in the myxedematous type of cretinism treatment with iodine normalizes thyroid function provided that the treatment is begun early in the postnatal period. If not, the prognosis remains dismal.

== History ==
Myxedema was first treated successfully in 1891 when George Redmayne Murray diagnosed a 46-year-old woman with the disease. He prescribed an extract from sheep thyroid. The patient improved significantly within a few weeks and lived another 28 years while taking the sheep thyroid extract.

== Etymology ==
The word myxedema originates from μύξᾰ, meaning "mucus" or "slimy substance", and οἴδημα for "swelling".
