= Cryptic self epitopes =

In immunology, cryptic self epitopes are a source of autoimmunity.

Self epitopes, which are found in high concentration on the surface of antigen-presenting cells (APCs) in association with its major histocompatibility complex (MHC) are known as dominant epitopes. These are stimulants of negative selection mechanisms to remove potentially self destructing autoreactive T cells. Their "self" antigens are displayed to a developing T-cell and signal those "self-reactive" T-cells to die via programmed cell death (apoptosis) and thereby deletion from the T cell repertoire, preventing autoimmunity.

However, self epitopes which appear in very low concentration on APC are termed cryptic in the sense that they do not delete autoreactive T-cells which will then join the peripheral adult T cell repertoire. This causes autoimmunity in the body.
