= Thyroid lymphoma =

- Specialty: ENT surgery, endocrinology, oncology

Thyroid lymphoma is a rare cancer constituting 1% to 2% of all thyroid cancers and less than 2% of lymphomas. Thyroid lymphomas are classified as non–Hodgkin's B-cell lymphomas in a majority of cases, although Hodgkin's lymphoma of the thyroid has also been identified.

== Signs and symptoms ==
As with other thyroid lesions, thyroid lymphoma affects predominantly females over 70 years of age with a history of Hashimoto's thyroiditis. Thus, Hashimoto's thyroiditis is considered a risk factor for thyroid lymphoma development. Thyroid lymphoma manifests as a rapidly enlarging neck mass which may compress the nearby trachea thereby causing narrowing or obstruction of the airway resulting in breathing difficulties or even respiratory failure. On physical examination, affected people typically exhibit a firm thyroid gland and enlarged lymph nodes.

- Painless neck mass
- Hoarseness
- Difficulty swallowing
- Signs of tracheal compression

== Diagnosis ==
Thyroid lymphoma poses a diagnostic and therapeutic challenge. This is because several manifestation patterns are similar to those of anaplastic thyroid cancer (ATC). Fine-needle aspiration (FNA) helps distinguish the two entities preoperatively.

=== Histopathology ===
The majority of thyroid lymphomas are non–Hodgkin's B-cell lymphomas; a minority exhibit properties of T-cell lymphomas.

- Diffuse large B-cell lymphoma with marginal zone
- Diffuse large B-cell lymphoma without marginal zone
- Marginal zone В-cell lymphoma of mucosa-associated lymphoid tissue (MALT)
- Follicular lymphoma

=== Staging ===
Staging of thyroid lymphoma is shown in the table below

Stage	Characteristics
1Е	Lymphoma is located within the thyroid
2Е	Lymphoma is located within the thyroid and regional lymph-nodes
3Е	Lymphoma is located at both sides of diaphragm
4Е	Dissemination of lymphoma

== Treatment ==
Combined modality therapy is the most common approach for the initial treatment of thyroid lymphomas. The CHOP regimen (cyclophosphamide, doxorubicin, vincristine and prednisone) has been shown to be highly effective for many types of thyroid lymphoma. However, it is suggested to perform radiation therapy only for MALT resulting a 96% complete response, with only a 30% relapse rate. Surgical treatment might be performed for patients with thyroid lymphoma in addition to chemotherapy and radiation, particularly for MALT lymphomas.

== Prognosis ==
The factors of poor prognosis for people with thyroid lymphoma are advanced stage of the tumor, large size (>10 cm) as well as spreading to mediastinum. The overall survival for primary thyroid lymphoma is 50% to 70%, ranging from 80% in stage IE to less than 36% in stage IIE and IVE in 5 years.
