= Cold sensitivity =

Unusual discomfort when in a cool environment

- Symptoms: Weakness, feeling extremely cold, cold hands and feet, shakiness
- Differential diagnosis: Hypothyroidism, anemia, fibromyalgia or vasoconstriction

Cold sensitivity or cold intolerance is unusual discomfort felt by some people when in a cool environment.

Cold sensitivity may be a symptom of hypothyroidism, anemia, low body weight, iron deficiency, vitamin B_{12} deficiency, fevers, fibromyalgia or vasoconstriction. There may also be differences in people in the expression of uncoupling proteins, thus affecting their amount of thermogenesis. Psychology may also play a factor in perceived temperature.

Possible causes include non-freezing cold injury.
