= Hürthle cell neoplasm =

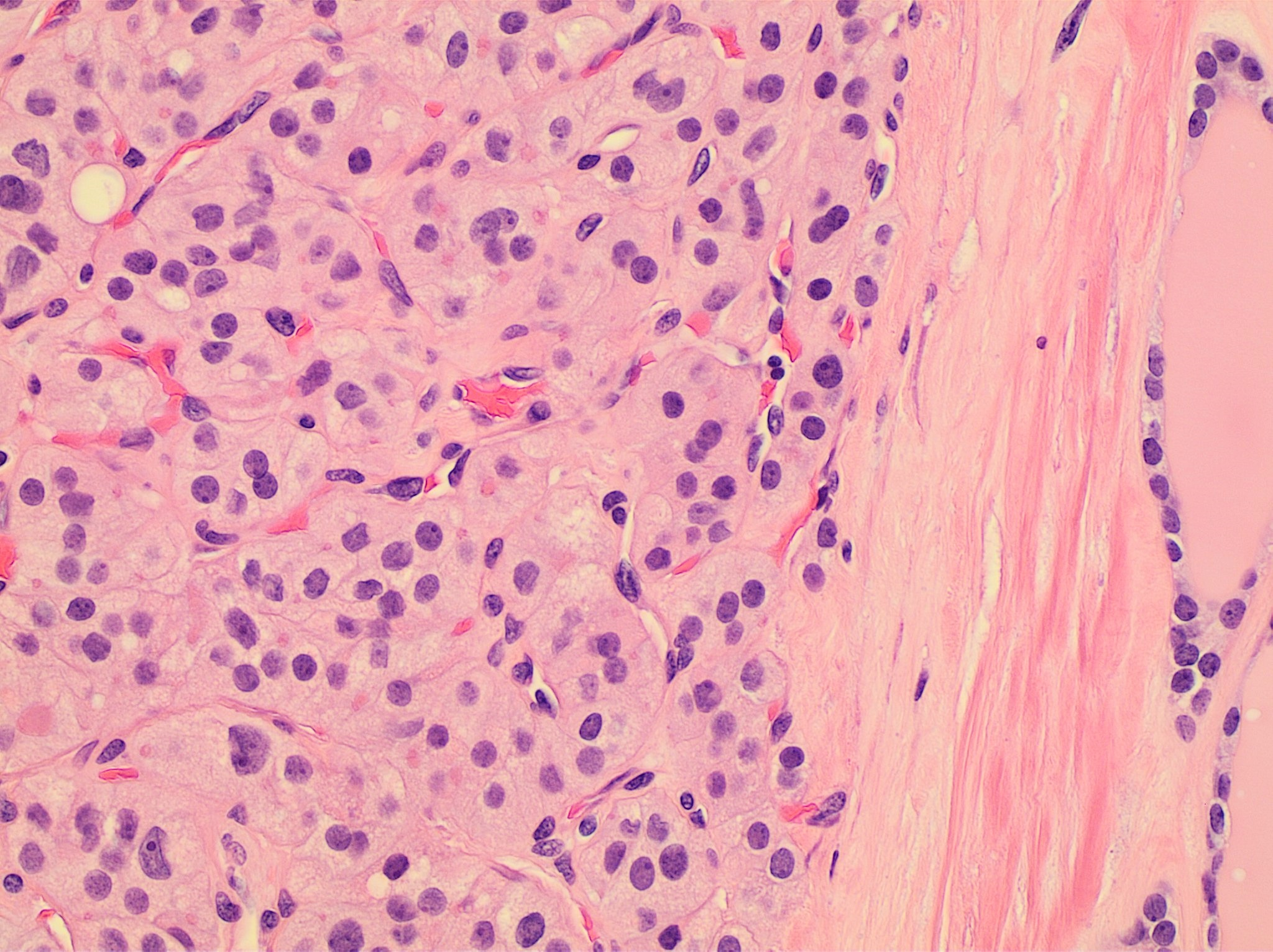
- Histopathology of a Hürthle cell adenoma
- Specialty: Oncology

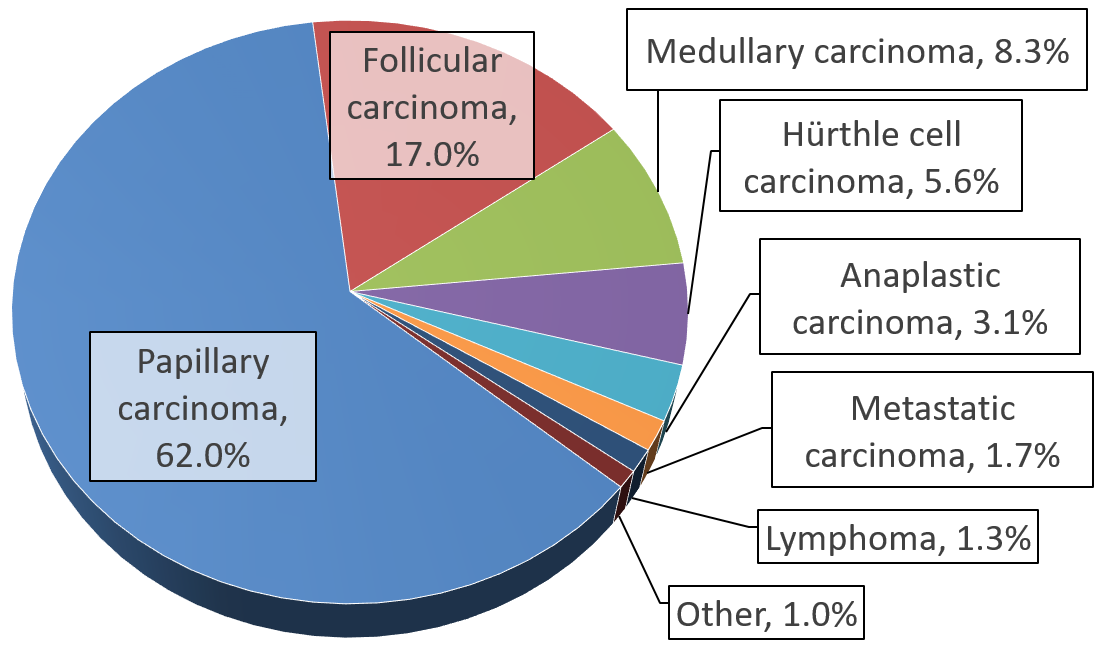
Relative incidences of malignant thyroid tumors, with Hürthle cell carcinoma near top right.

Hürthle cell neoplasm is a rare tumor of the thyroid, typically seen in women between the ages of 70 and 80 years old. When benign, it is called a Hürthle cell adenoma, and when malignant it is called a Hürthle cell carcinoma. Hürthle cell adenoma is characterized by a mass of benign Hürthle cells (Askanazy cells). Typically such a mass is removed because it is not easy to predict whether it will transform into the malignant counterpart of Hürthle cell carcinoma, which is a subtype of follicular thyroid cancer.

== Histology ==
Hürthle Cell Adenoma nodule observed in 3D image of Thyroid

Hürthle cells are characterized as enlarged epithelial cells. These cells, when stained with hematoxylin-eosin show as pink. This is due to the abundant mitochondria and granular eosinophilic matter within the cells' cytoplasm. These cells are often found in the thyroid. The thyroid is a butterfly-shaped organ, responsible for producing various hormones for metabolism. These cells are often benign, but they can be malignant and metastasize. Hürthle cells are resistant to radiation, but can be treated using radioactive iodine treatment.

== Diagnosis ==
This mass can be detected and removed before transformation and metastasis. The tumor is often detected by imaging such as ultrasound. The location and size of the tumor may cause pressure and pain to the patient. But often the tumor goes undetected. After detection, the mass is tested using an invasive fine-needle aspiration biopsy. Hürthle cell adenoma is the benign analogue of Hürthle cell carcinoma. This adenoma is extremely rare; when it occurs, it usually occurs in women. Often the adenoma is harmless but is removed after detection because its future course cannot be trusted.

=== Cytopathology ===
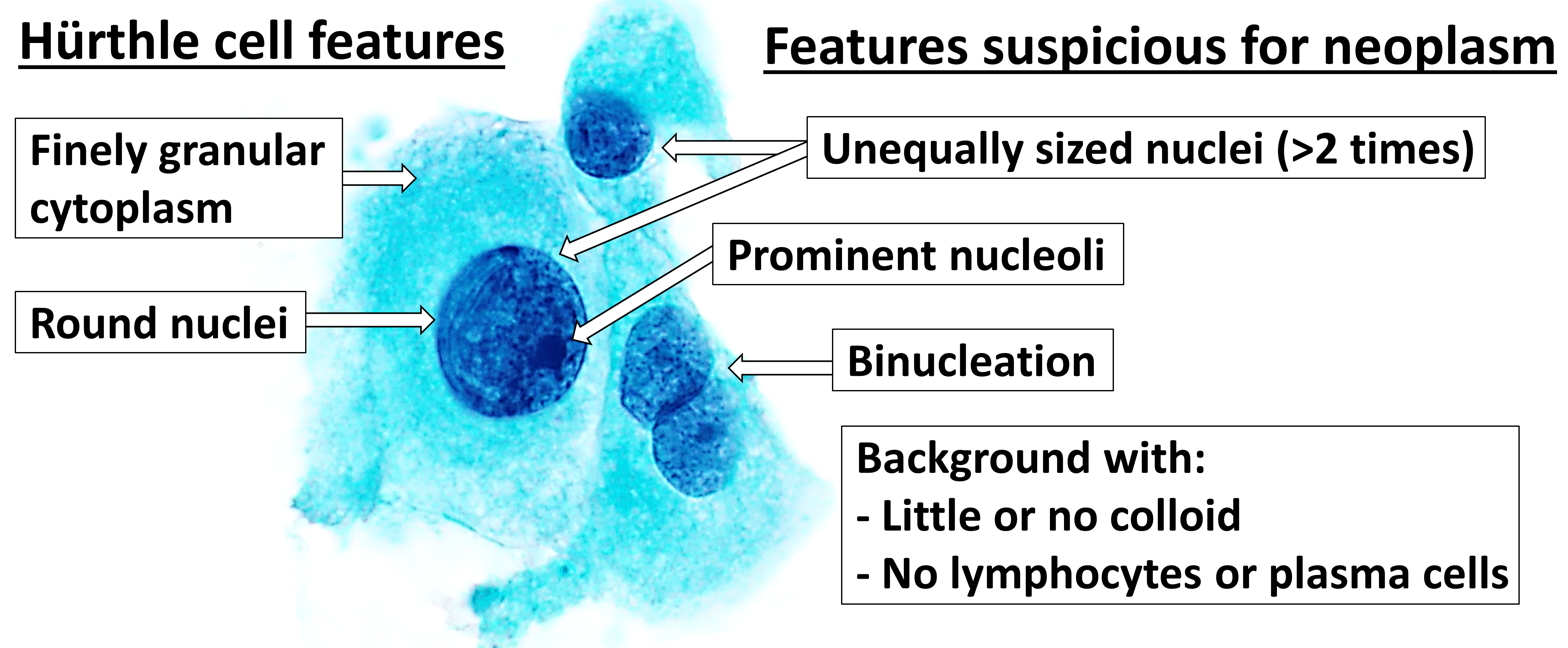
Cytopathology suspicious for Hürthle cell neoplasm (Bethesda category IV, rather than normal or hyperplastic Hürthle cells), Pap stain.

Cytopathology cannot distinguish Hürthle cell adenoma from Hürthle cell carcinoma, which requires histopathologic sections to see transcapsular or vascular invasion. Hürthle cell hyperplasia (as seen in Hashimoto's thyroiditis) may show moderate variation in nuclear sizes and prominent nucleoli, but further findings favoring Hürthle cell neoplasm include a large number of Hürthle cells, and discohesiveness.

== Treatment ==
There are three main treatments for Hürthle cell adenomas. Once the adenoma is detected most often the nodules removed to prevent the cells from later metastisizing. A total thyroidectomy is often performed, this results in a complete removal of the thyroid. Some patients may only have half of their thyroid removed, this is known as a thyroid lobectomy. Another treatment option includes pharmacological suppression of thyroid hormone. The thyroid gland is responsible for producing the thyroid hormones triiodothyronine (T3) and thyroxine (T4). Patients with suppressed thyroid function often require oral thyroid replacement (e.g. levothyroxine) in order to maintain normal thyroid hormone levels. The final treatment option is RAI ablation (radioactive iodine ablation). This treatment option is used to destroy infected thyroid cells after total thyroidectomy. This treatment does not change prognosis of disease, but will diminish the recurrence rate. Also, Hürthle cells do not respond well to RAI. However, often doctors suggest this treatment to patients with Hürthle cell adenoma and Hürthle cell carcinoma because some Hürthle cells will respond and it will kill remaining tissue.

== History ==
The first Hürthle cell adenoma was discovered by Dr James Ewing in 1928. Hürthle cells were discovered in the 1890s and are named after Karl Hürthle and Max Askanazy.
