= Oncocyte =

Epithelial cell with excess mitochondria

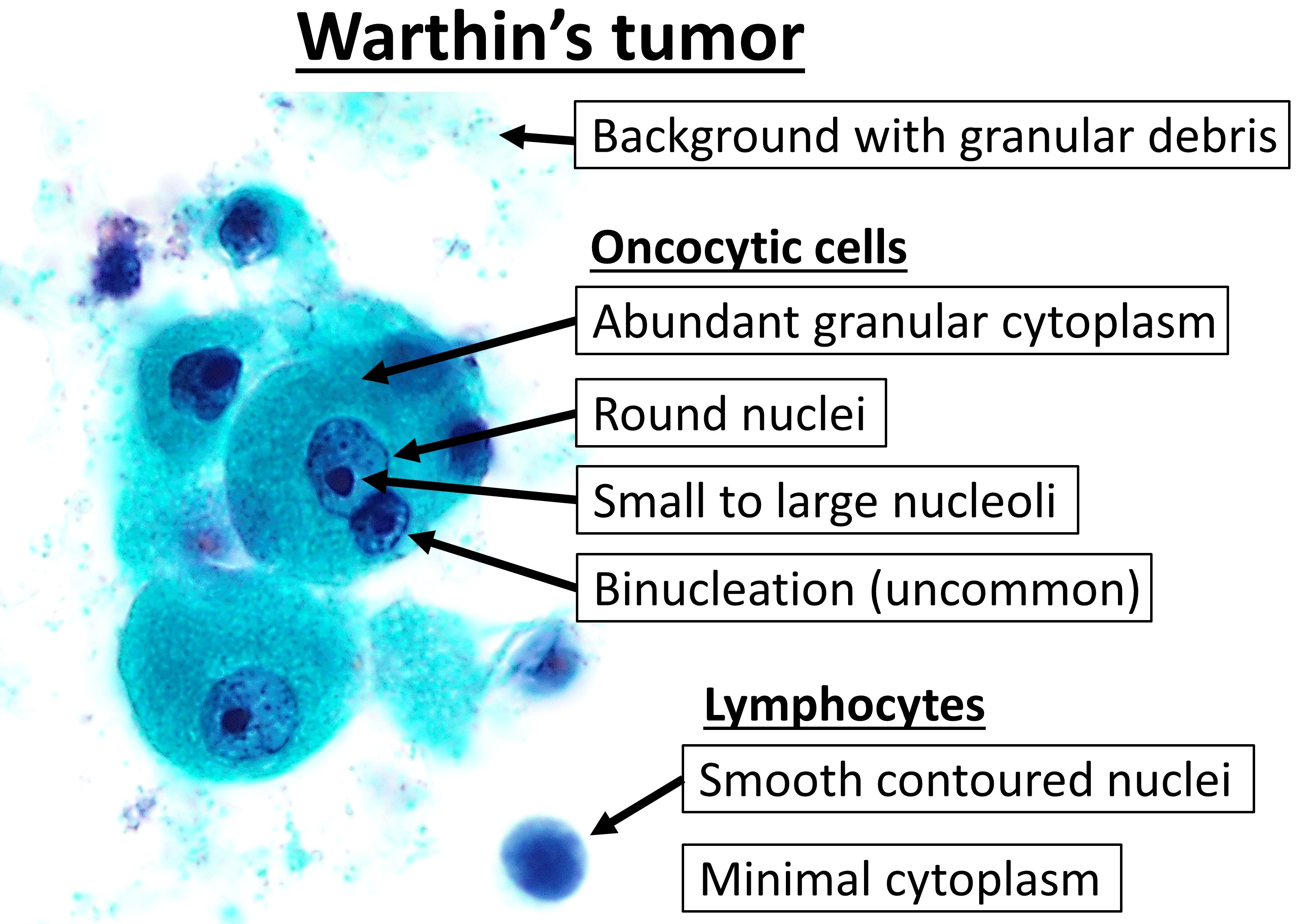
Cytopathology of Warthin's tumor, with typical cellular features (and a relatively uncommon binucleated cell). Pap stain. The relatively large size of the oncocytes is seen when comparing to the lymphocyte.

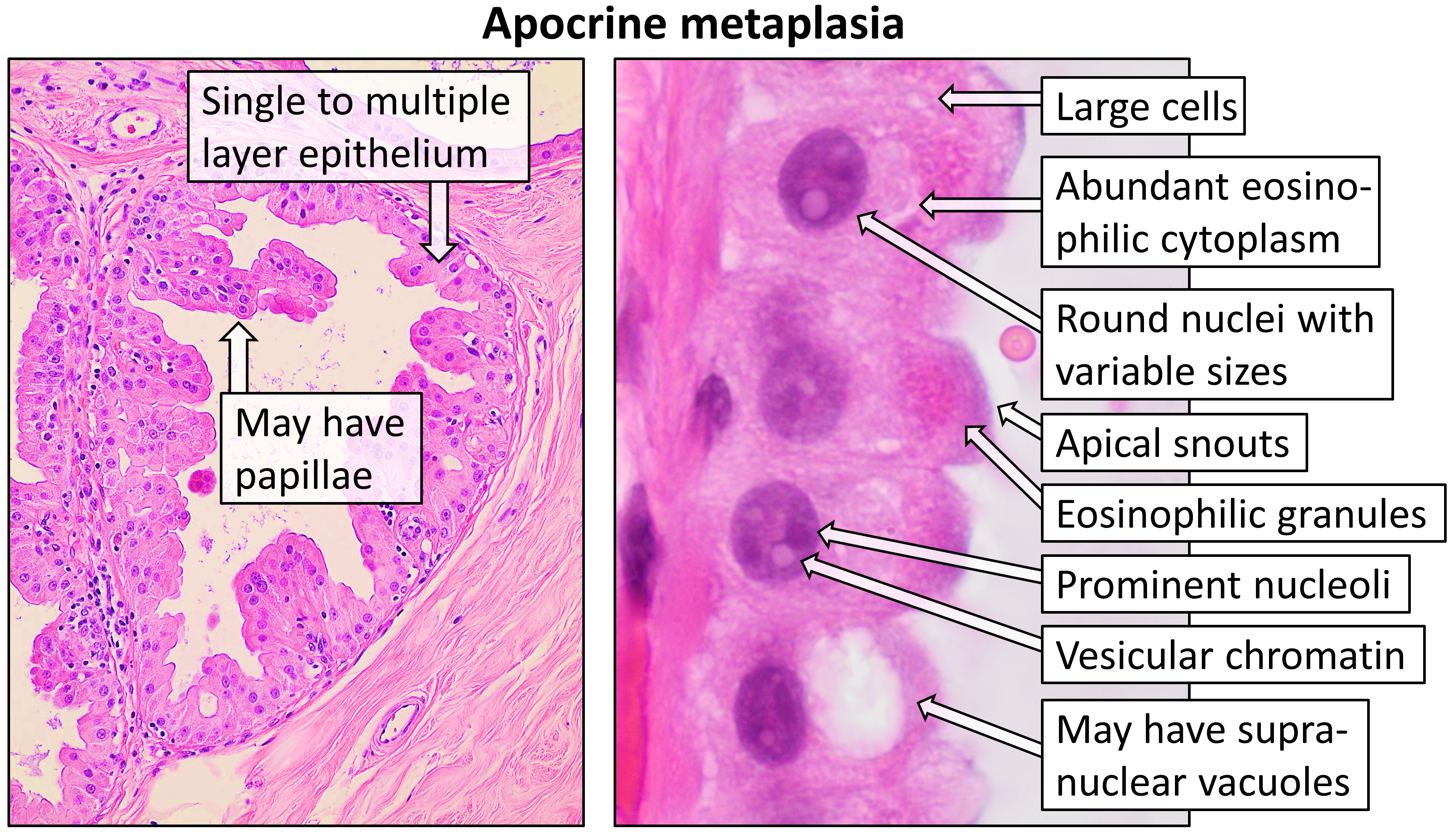
Micrograph showing apocrine-type metaplasia of the breast with typical oncocytes. H&E stain.

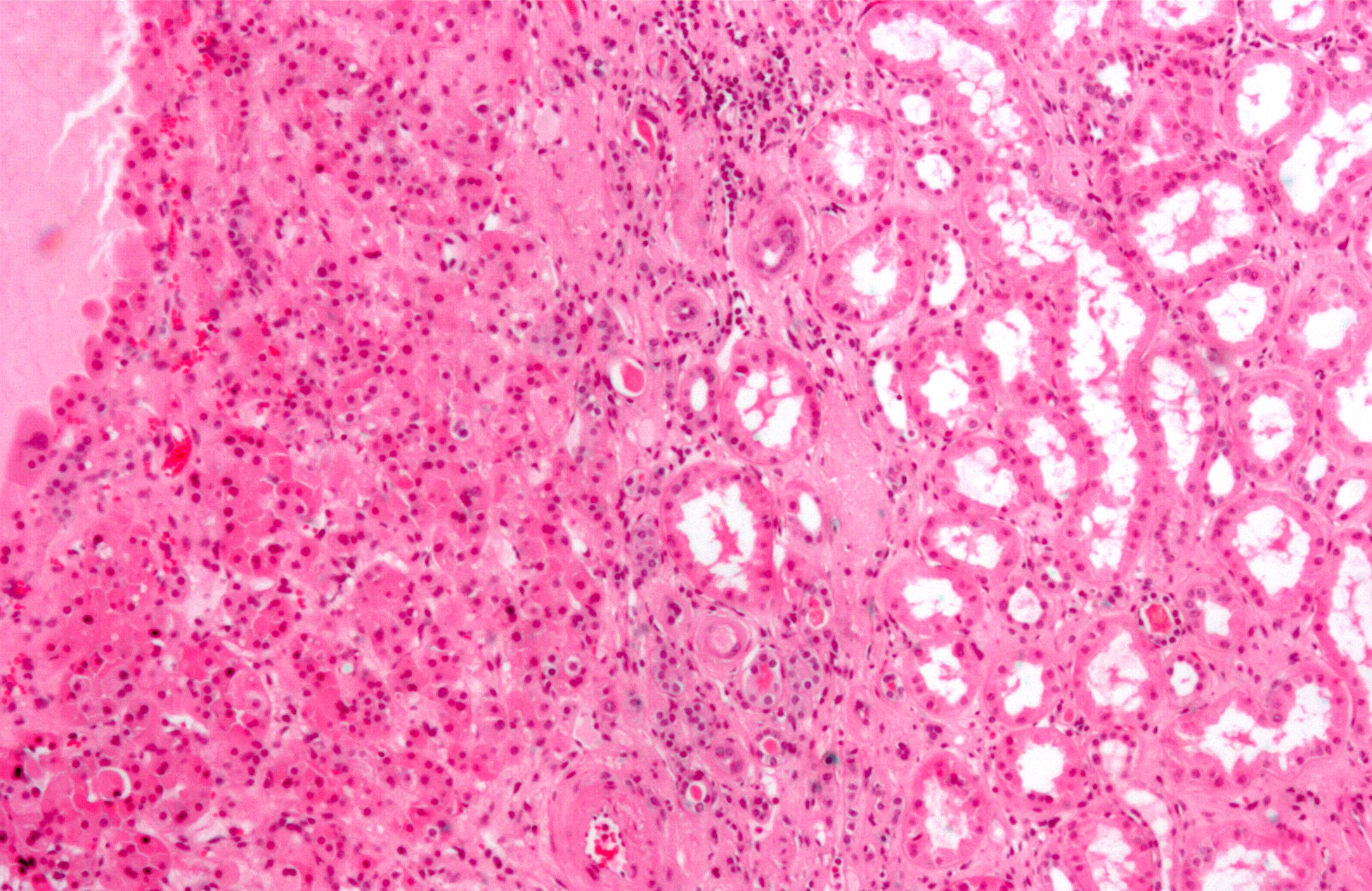
Oncocytes (left of image), as seen in a renal oncocytoma. H&E stain.

An oncocyte is an epithelial cell characterized by an excessive number of mitochondria, resulting in an abundant acidophilic, granular cytoplasm. Oncocytes can be benign or malignant.

== Other names ==
Also known as:

- Hürthle cell (thyroid gland only)
- Oxyphilic cell
- Askanazy cell
- Apocrine-type metaplasia (breast gland only).
- Oncocytic cell

== Etymology ==
Derived from the Greek root onco-, which means mass, bulk.

== See also ==
- Hurthle cell carcinoma, a variant of follicular thyroid carcinoma.
- Oncocytoma, a tumour composed of oncocytes, may be found as a less common salivary gland neoplasm also known as oxyphilic adenoma.
- Renal oncocytoma, a kidney tumour composed of oncocytes.
