= Kidney tumour =

- Other names: Kidney tumors, renal tumours
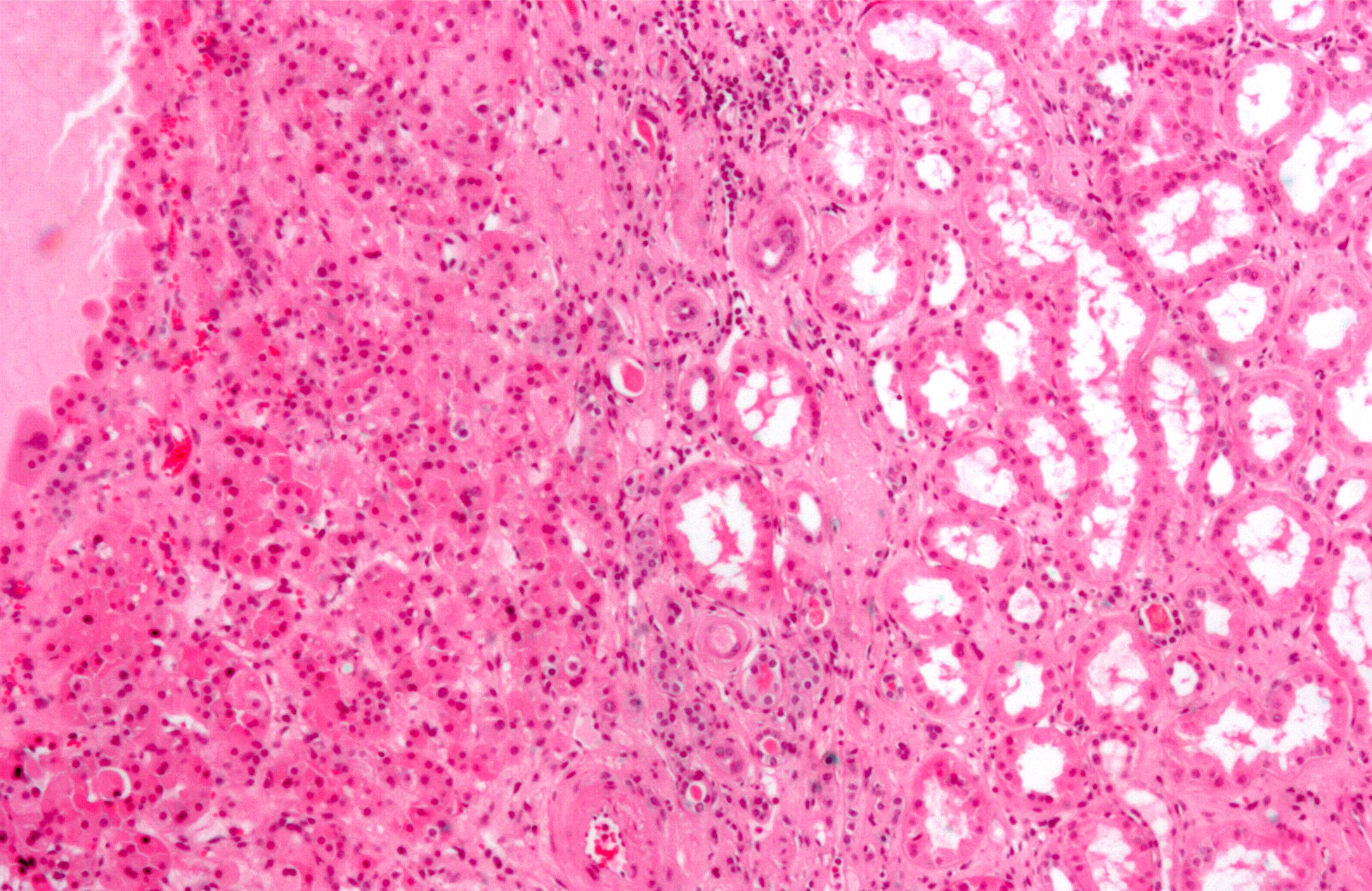
- Micrograph of a renal oncocytoma, a type of benign kidney tumour. H&E stain.
- Specialty: Oncology, nephrology

Kidney tumours are tumours, growths, or neoplasm, of, on or in the kidney. These growths can be benign or malignant (kidney cancer).

== Presentation ==
Kidney tumours may be discovered on medical imaging incidentally (i.e. an incidentaloma), or may be present in patients as an abdominal mass or kidney cyst, hematuria, abdominal pain, or manifest first in a paraneoplastic syndrome that seems unrelated to the kidney. Other markers or complications that may arise from kidney tumours can appear to be more subtle, including; low hemoglobin, fatigue, nausea, constipation, and/or hyperglycemia.

== Diagnosis ==
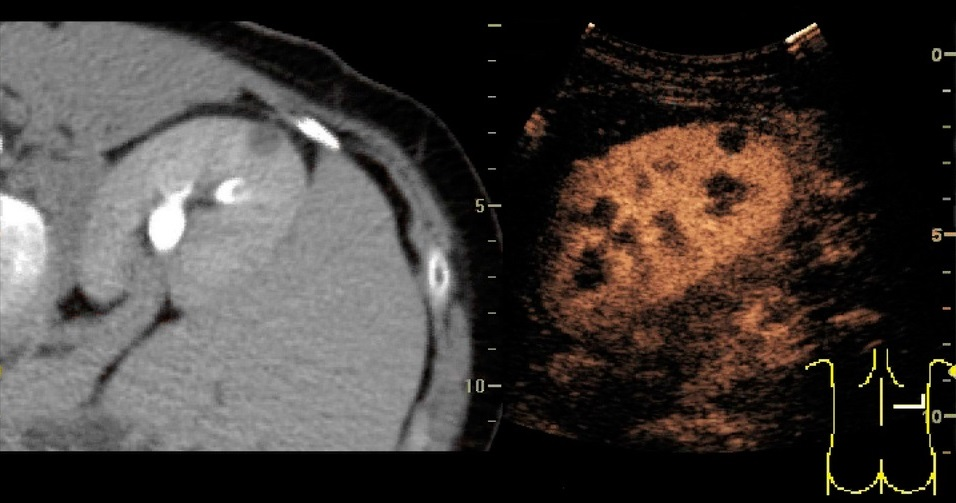
Unspecific cortical lesion on CT scan is confirmed cystic and benign with contrast-enhanced renal ultrasonography.

A CT scan is the first choice modality for workup of solid masses in the kidneys. Nevertheless, hemorrhagic cysts can resemble renal cell carcinomas on CT, but they are easily distinguished with Doppler ultrasonography (Doppler US). In renal cell carcinomas, Doppler US often shows vessels with high velocities caused by neovascularization and arteriovenous shunting. Some renal cell carcinomas are hypovascular and not distinguishable with Doppler US. Therefore, renal tumors without a Doppler signal, which are not obvious simple cysts on US and CT, should be further investigated with contrast-enhanced ultrasound, as this is more sensitive than both Doppler US and CT for the detection of hypovascular tumors.

=== Renal ultrasonography ===
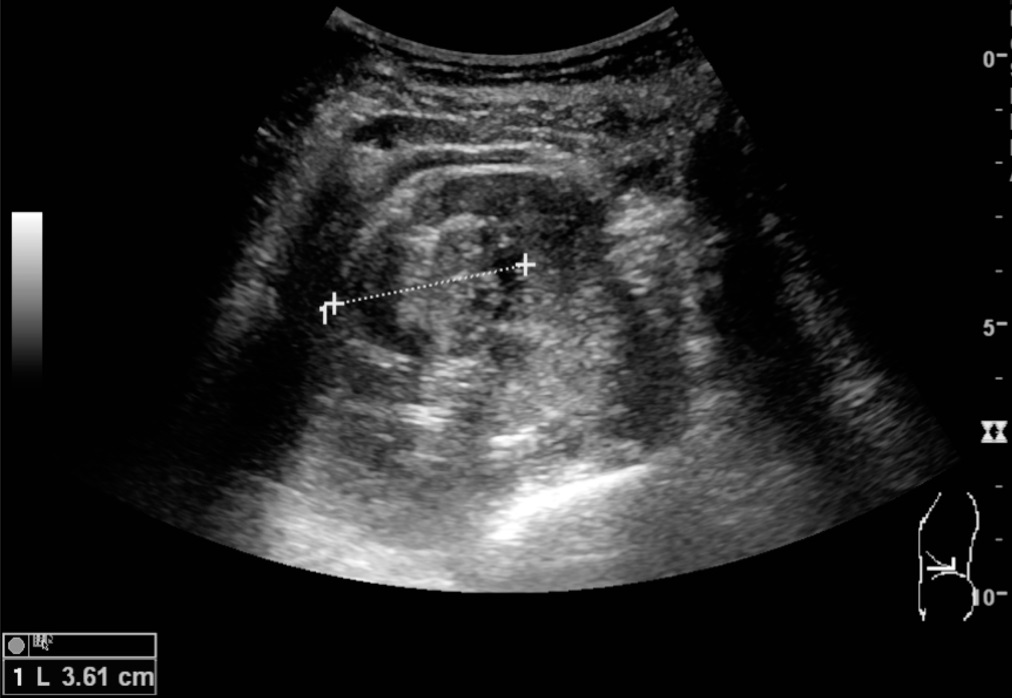
Cortical solid mass, which later was shown to be renal cell carcinoma. Measurement of the solid mass on the US image is illustrated by '+' and a dashed line.

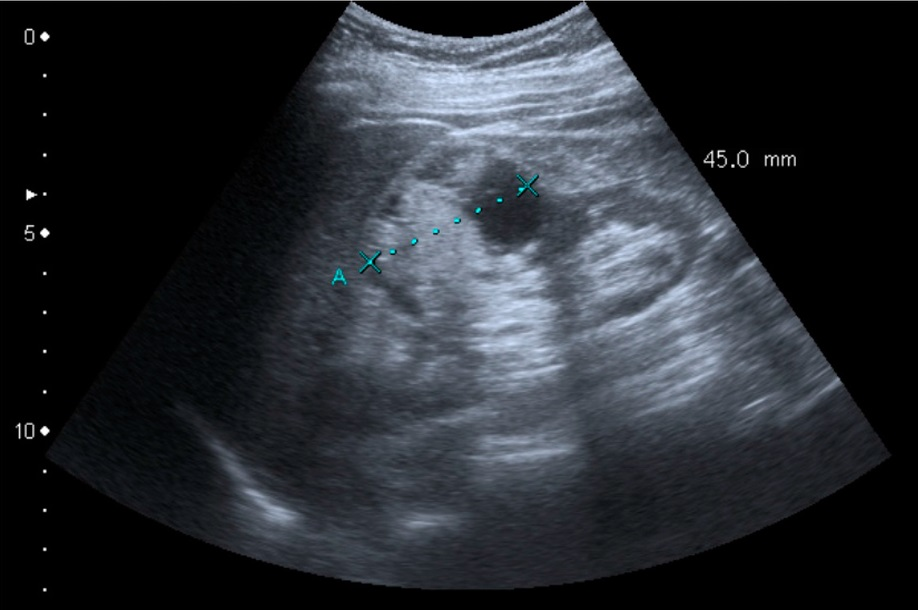
Renal cell carcinoma with both cystic and solid components located in the cortex. Measurement of tumor on the US image is illustrated by '+' and a dashed line.

On renal ultrasonography, a solid renal mass appears in the US exam with internal echoes, without the well-defined, smooth walls seen in cysts, often with Doppler signal, and is frequently malignant or has a high malignant potential. The most common malignant renal parenchymal tumor is renal cell carcinoma (RCC), which accounts for 86% of the malignancies in the kidney. RCCs are typically isoechoic and peripherally located in the parenchyma, but can be both hypo- and hyper-echoic and are found centrally in medulla or sinus. The lesions can be multifocal and have cystic elements due to necrosis, calcifications and be multifocal (Figure 8 and Figure 9). RCC is associated with von Hippel–Lindau disease, and with tuberous sclerosis, and US has been recommended as a tool for assessment and follow-up of renal masses in these patients.

=== Classification ===
There are many forms of kidney tumours:

==== Malignant (cancerous) ====
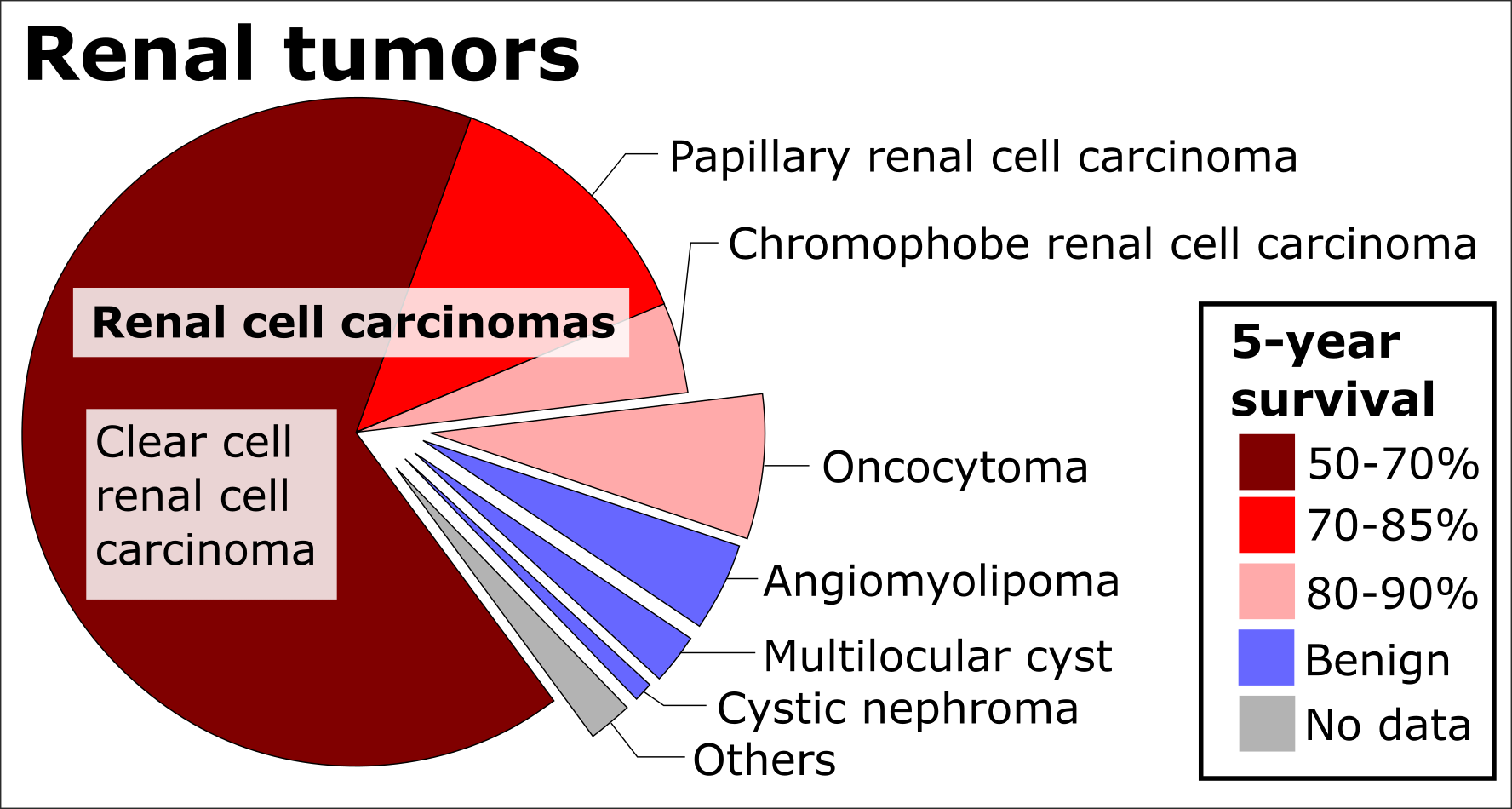
Histopathologic types of kidney tumor, with relative incidences and prognoses.

Like other cancers, kidney cancer is measured in stages.

•Stage 1, the tumour has not spread and is localized. This accounts for 65% of cases of kidney cancer and 92.5% of people with stage 1 kidney cancer survive 5 years.

•Stage 2 and 3, the tumour has grown larger and has spread and started to affect regional tissues and lymph nodes. This stage accounts for 17% of kidney cancers and 69% of people are expected to live 5 years with this progression of kidney cancer.

•Stage 4, the kidney tumour has spread to a distant organ or lymph node. 16% of kidney cancers are progressed to this stage and of those people, 12% of them are expected to live 5 years.

- The most frequent, malignant, primary kidney cancer is renal cell carcinoma (RCC) - which has several subtypes:
  - Clear cell RCC, an epithelial cell tumour of the kidney that accounts for 65-70% of all RCCs.
  - Papillary RCC, a renal tumour that accounts for 10-15% of all RCCs. Males are 1.5 times as likely to develop this type of tumour than females. Papillary RCCs, usually lead to a better prognosis than clear cell RCCs unless the tumour has metastasized.
  - Chromophobe RCC, a kidney tumour with usually the best outcome of prognosis. It accounts for 5-7% percent of RCCs.
  - Collecting duct RCC
- Mesoblastic nephroma, a congenital tumor of the kidney's mesenchyme (i.e. connective tissue cells) detected prenatally or, more typically, during the first <4 years of life.
- Metastatic tumour, e.g. ovarian carcinoma.

==== Benign ====
- Renal oncocytoma
- Cystic nephroma
- Angiomyolipoma
- Metanephric adenoma
- Renal medullary fibroma

=== Surgical complexity ===
The RENAL Nephrometry Scoring System is used to measure the complexity of kidney tumors for determining whether a renal mass is appropriate for partial or radical nephrectomy, and is estimated by CT scan as follows: The nephrometery score takes into account the size of the tumor (Radius), how much of the tumor is inside or outside of the kidney (Endophytic/Exophytic), how close the tumor is to the urinary collecting system (Nearness), whether the mass is on the anterior or posterior surface of the kidney (Anterior), location relative to polar lines(Lines), and whether or not it is touching the renal artery or vein. This system is used mainly to determine appropriateness of performing a partial nephrectomy where only the tumor itself is removed, or a radical nephrectomy.

Another factor affecting complexity includes renal vein thrombus, which can extend into the inferior vena cava and into the right atrium. The degree of extension is commonly graded as follows: At level 0, the thrombus extends to the renal vein only; at level I, the neoplastic emboli extends into the IVC to no more than 2 cm above the renal vein; at level II, the thrombus reaches into the IVC to more than 2 cm above the renal vein but not to the hepatic vein; moreover at level III, the thrombus reaches into the IVC above the hepatic veins but not above the diaphragm; and finally at level IV, the thrombus extends into the supradiaphragmatic IVC or the right atrium.

== Epidemiology ==
No direct determinant of kidney tumours has been discovered; however, factors that put one at a higher risk of developing them include; smoking, exposure to asbestos and other chemical carcinogens, being obese and/or consuming an unhealthy diet, having a family history of cancer, and alcohol and coffee consumption. The incidence rate of kidney tumours is greater in men than in women. The incidence of kidney tumours is more greatly distributed in North America and Europe than in Asia and South America. The incidence of small renal tumours (masses under 4 cm long) has been increasing since the 1980s. Because kidney tumours are often difficult to detect, the advancement of diagnostic imaging has inherently been correlated with the incidence rate. Although new diagnostic techniques are being utilized and kidney tumors have been diagnosed more often at a lower stage, the mortality rate of the tumours have not fluctuated accordingly.

| | Score | | |
| Component | 1 point | 2 points | 3 points |
|---|---|---|---|
| R (radius, maximal diameter) | ≤ 4 cm | > 4 and < 7 cm | ≥ 7 cm |
| E (exophytic/endophytic) | ≥ 50% exophytic | < 50% exophytic | Completely endophytic |
| N (nearness to collecting system/renal sinus) | ≥ 7 mm | > 4 and < 7 mm | ≤ 4 mm |
| A (anterior/posterior locator) | A descriptor of "a," "p," or "x" is assigned for tumour location. | | |
| L (location relative to polar lines) | Entirely below lower polar or entirely above upper polar line | Mass crosses polar line | 50% of the mass is across polar line, or mass is entirely between polar lines, or mass crosses axial midline |

A higher score indicates a higher difficulty in removing the tumor surgically, potentially making radical (total) nephrectomy necessary. Specific guidelines vary internationally, but in Hong Kong data, patients that underwent partial nephrectomy had scores averaging 7, and those with radical nephrectomy had scores averaging 9.
