= Oncocytoma =

Tumor composed of oncocytes (epithelial cells with excess mitochondria)

- Specialty: Oncology

An oncocytoma is a tumor made up of oncocytes, epithelial cells characterized by an excessive amount of mitochondria, resulting in an abundant acidophilic, granular cytoplasm. The cells and the tumor that they compose are often benign but sometimes may be premalignant or malignant.

== Presentation ==
An oncocytoma is an epithelial tumor composed of oncocytes, large eosinophilic cells having small, round, benign-appearing nuclei with large nucleoli.

Oncocytoma can arise in a number of organs.

== Renal oncocytoma ==
Renal oncocytoma is thought to arise from the intercalated cells of collecting ducts of the kidney. It represents 5% to 15% of surgically resected renal neoplasms.

== Salivary gland oncocytoma ==
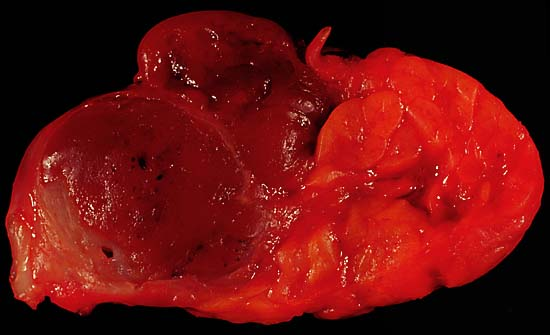
Oncocytoma of the salivary gland. This lesion presented as a lateral anterior neck mass. At surgery, it was found to be a soft 3.0 × 2.1 × 1.8 cm tumor of the submandibular salivary gland. The photo shows the characteristic dark color of an oncocytoma, a rare type of benign neoplasm, at the left side of the image (the normal lobulated salivary gland tissue is to the right).

An salivary gland oncocytoma (also known as an oxyphilic adenoma) is a well-circumscribed, benign neoplastic growth comprising about one percent of all salivary gland tumors. The histopathology is marked by sheets of large, swollen polyhedral epithelial oncocytes, which are granular acidophilic parotid cells with centrally located nuclei. The granules are created by the mitochondria.

=== Symptoms ===
Salivary gland oncocytomas, 85 to 90 percent of which are located in the parotid gland, are firm, slowly growing, painless masses of less than 4 cm and may be bilateral. They are most common in females age 70 to 80.

== Thyroid oncocytoma ==
Thyroid oncocytomas (also known as Hürthle cell tumours) can be benign (adenomas) or malignant (carcinomas). Grossly, oncocytic adenomas are encapsulated, solid nodules with a characteristic brown cut surface. The gross appearance of a minimally invasive oncocytic carcinoma is indistinguishable to that of an adenoma, while widely invasive oncocytic carcinomas are obviously invasive macroscopically and display pervasive vascular invasion with multifocal involvement of the thyroid gland. There are no reliable cytologic features which distinguish oncocytic adenomas from carcinomas and the only criterion for a diagnosis of malignancy is the identification of transcapsular or vascular invasion.

=== Symptoms ===
Patients with thyroid oncocytomas present with a thyroid nodule, usually with normal thyroid function. If the tumor is big or invasive, there may be other symptoms such as difficulty swallowing or talking.

== Additional images ==
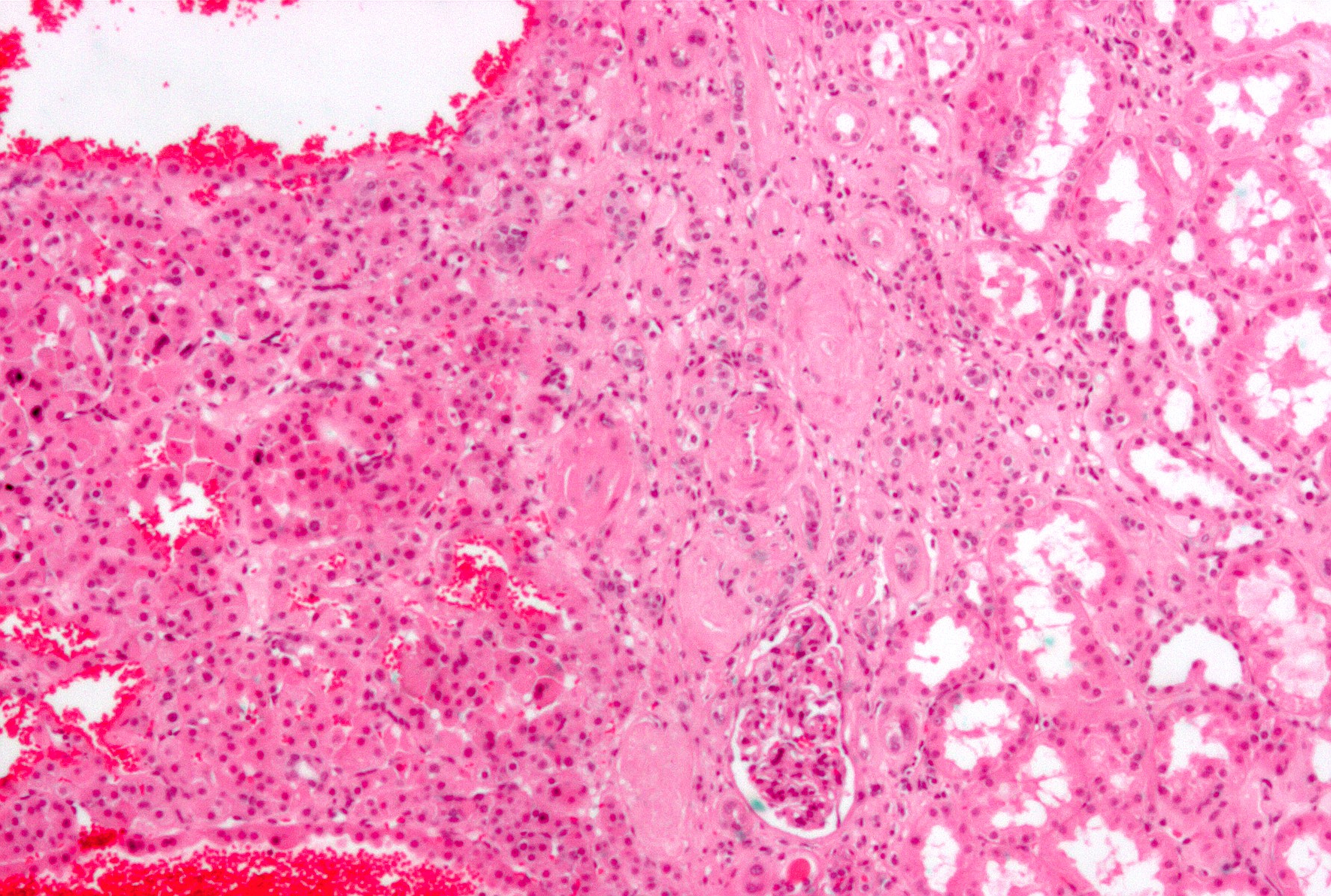
Micrograph of a renal oncocytoma. H&E stain.

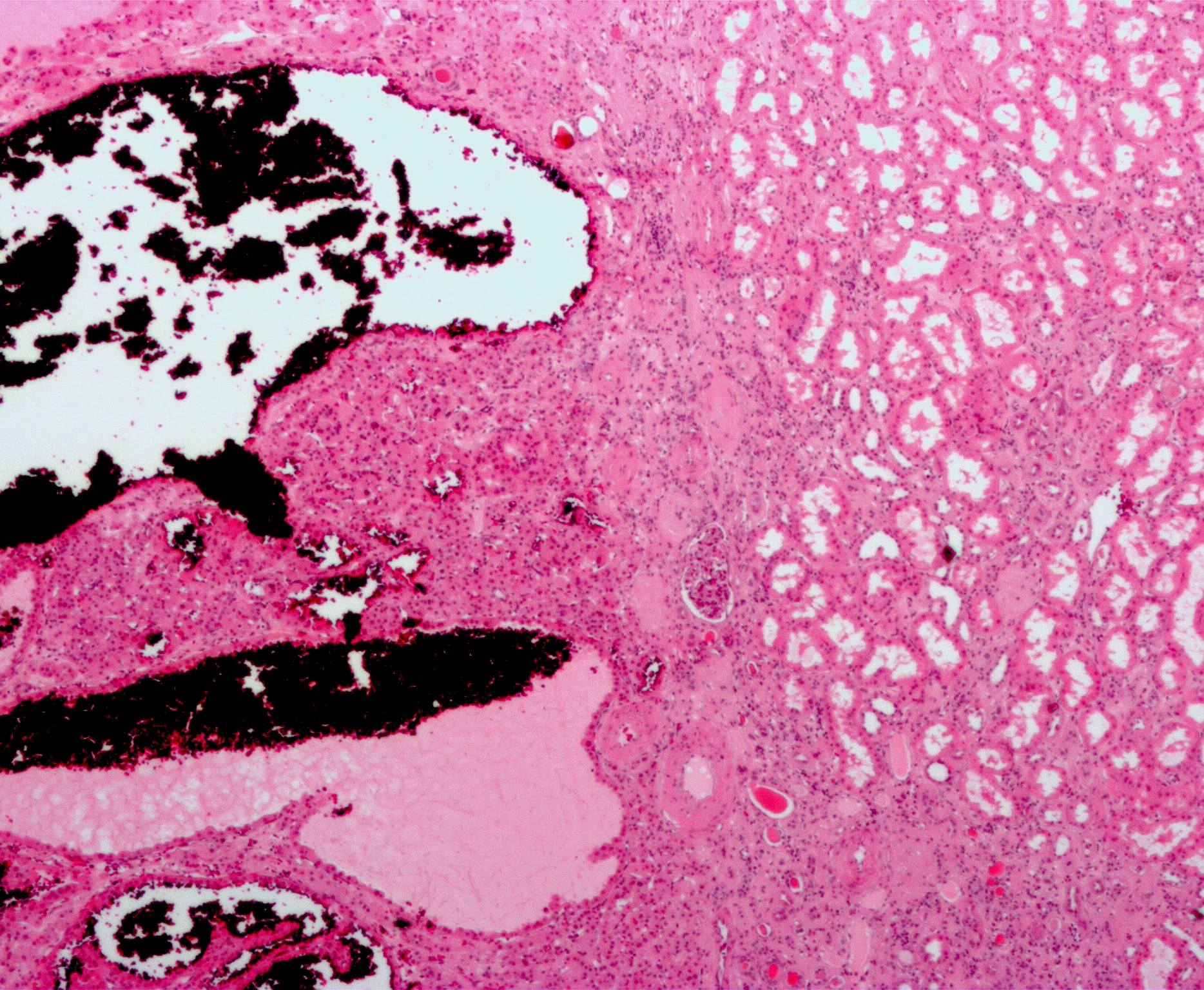
Micrograph of a renal oncocytoma. H&E stain.

Gross appearance of the cut surface of a nephrectomy specimen containing a renal oncocytoma. Note the rounded contour, the mahogany colour and the central scar.

== See also ==
- Kidney
- Renal cell carcinoma
- Hurthle cell
