= Cystic nephroma =

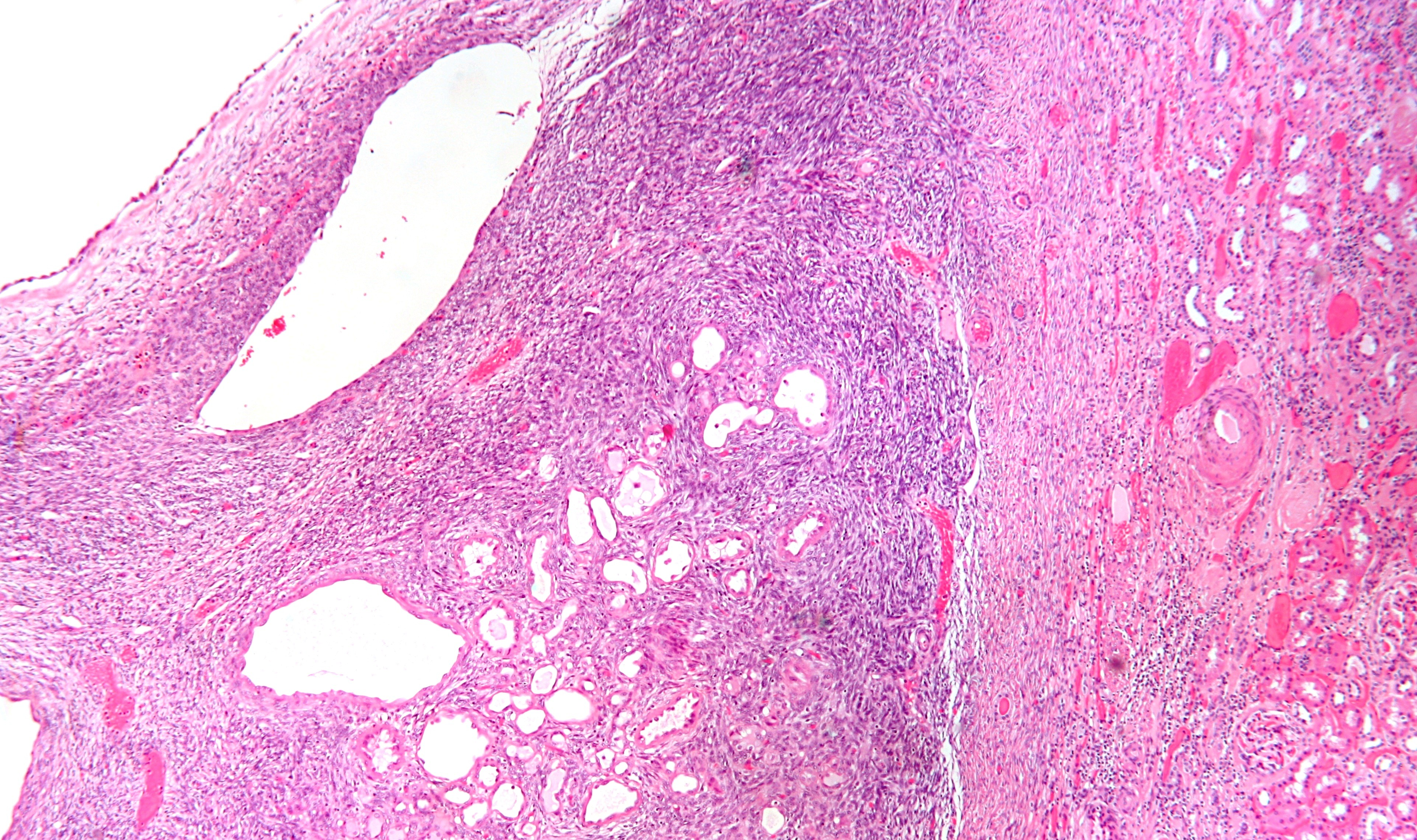
- Micrograph of a cystic nephroma (left of image). Normal kidney is seen on the right. H&E stain.
- Specialty: Oncology

A cystic nephroma, also known as multilocular cystic nephroma, mixed epithelial stromal tumour (MEST) and renal epithelial stromal tumour (REST), is a type of rare benign kidney tumour.

== Symptoms ==
Cystic nephromas are often asymptomatic. They are typically discovered on medical imaging incidentally (i.e. an incidentaloma).

== Diagnosis ==
Cystic nephromas are diagnosed by biopsy or excision. It is important to correctly diagnose them as, radiologically, they may mimic the appearance of a renal cell carcinoma that is cystic.

=== Pathologic diagnosis ===
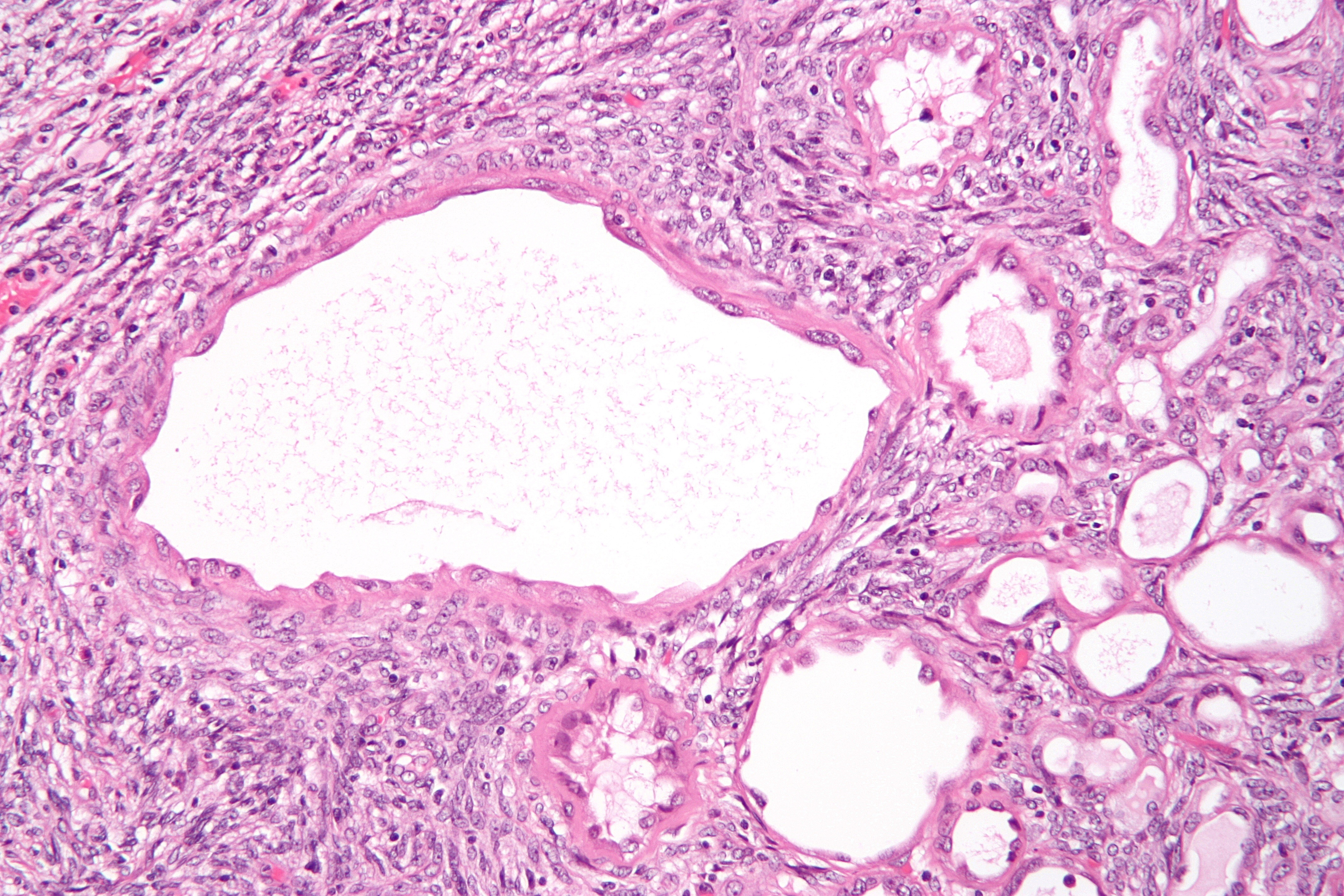
High magnification micrograph of a cystic nephroma showing the characteristic simple epithelium with hobnail morphology, and the ovarian-like stroma. H&E stain.

The characteristics of cystic nephromas are:

- Cysts lined by a simple epithelium with a hobnail morphology, i.e. the nuclei of the cyst lining epithelium bulges into the lumen of the cysts,
- Ovarian-like stroma that has a:
  - Spindle cell morphology, and has a
  - Basophilic cytoplasm.

Cystic nephromas have an immunostaining pattern like ovarian stroma; they are positive for:

- Estrogen receptor (ER),
- Progesterone receptor (PR) and
- CD10.

=== Differential diagnosis ===
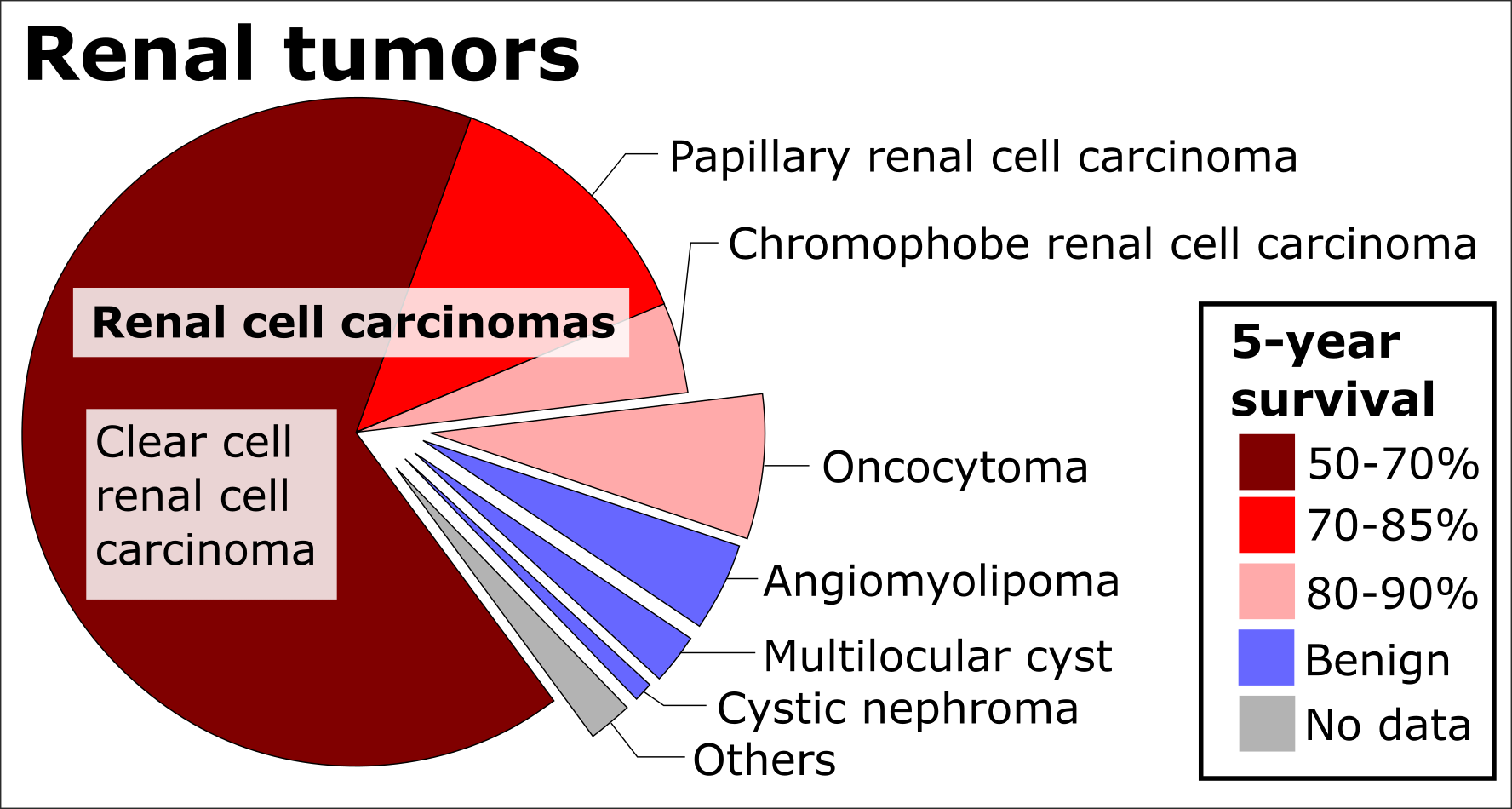
Histopathologic types of kidney tumor, with relative incidences and prognoses. Cystic nephroma is seen at bottom right in pie chart.

- cystic partially differentiated nephroblastoma
- cystic standard nephroblastoma (cystic Wilm's tumor)
- cystic mesoblastic nephroma
- cystic renal cell carcinoma
- other renal cysts

== Additional images ==
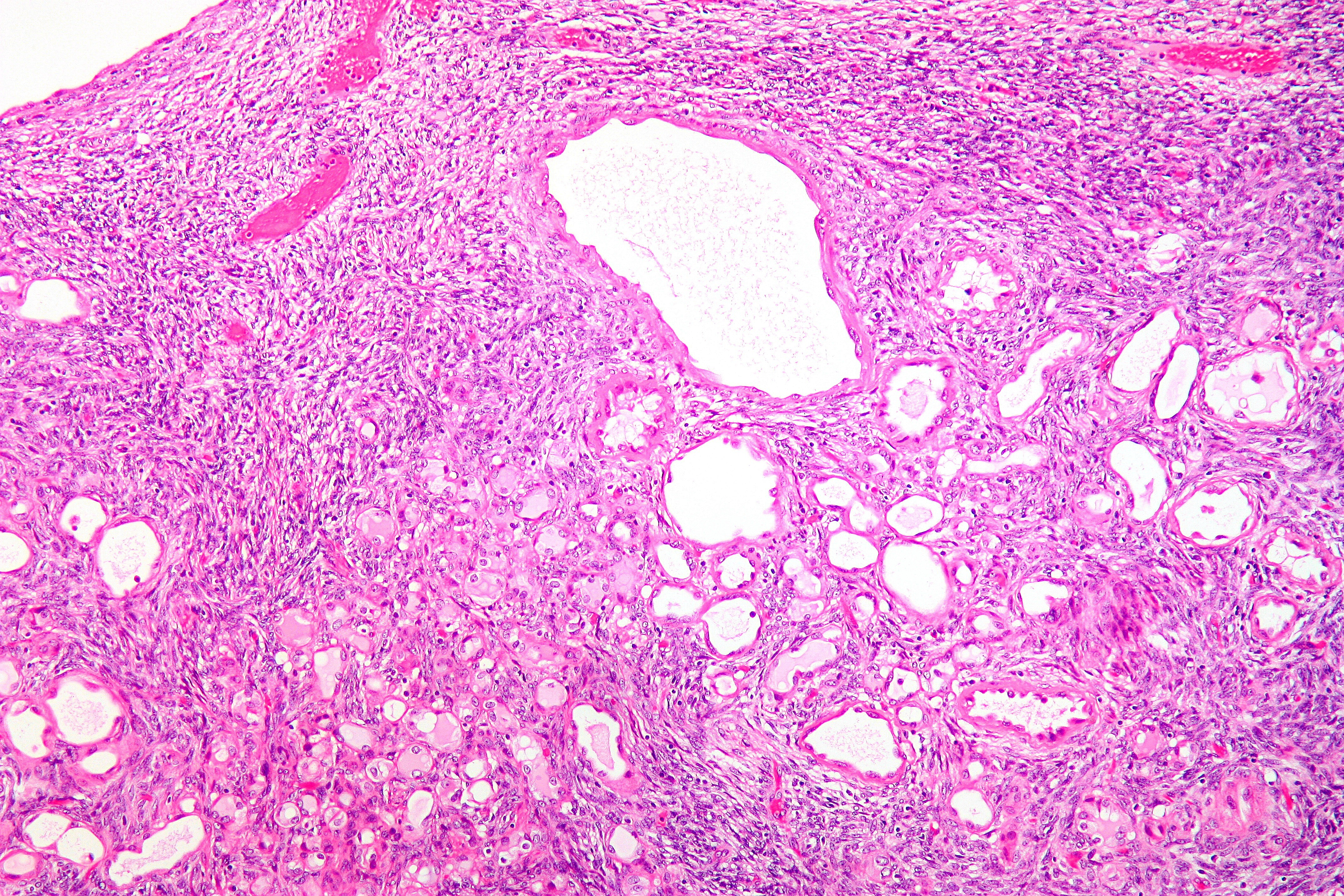
Micrograph of a cystic nephroma. H&E stain.
