= Renal oncocytoma =

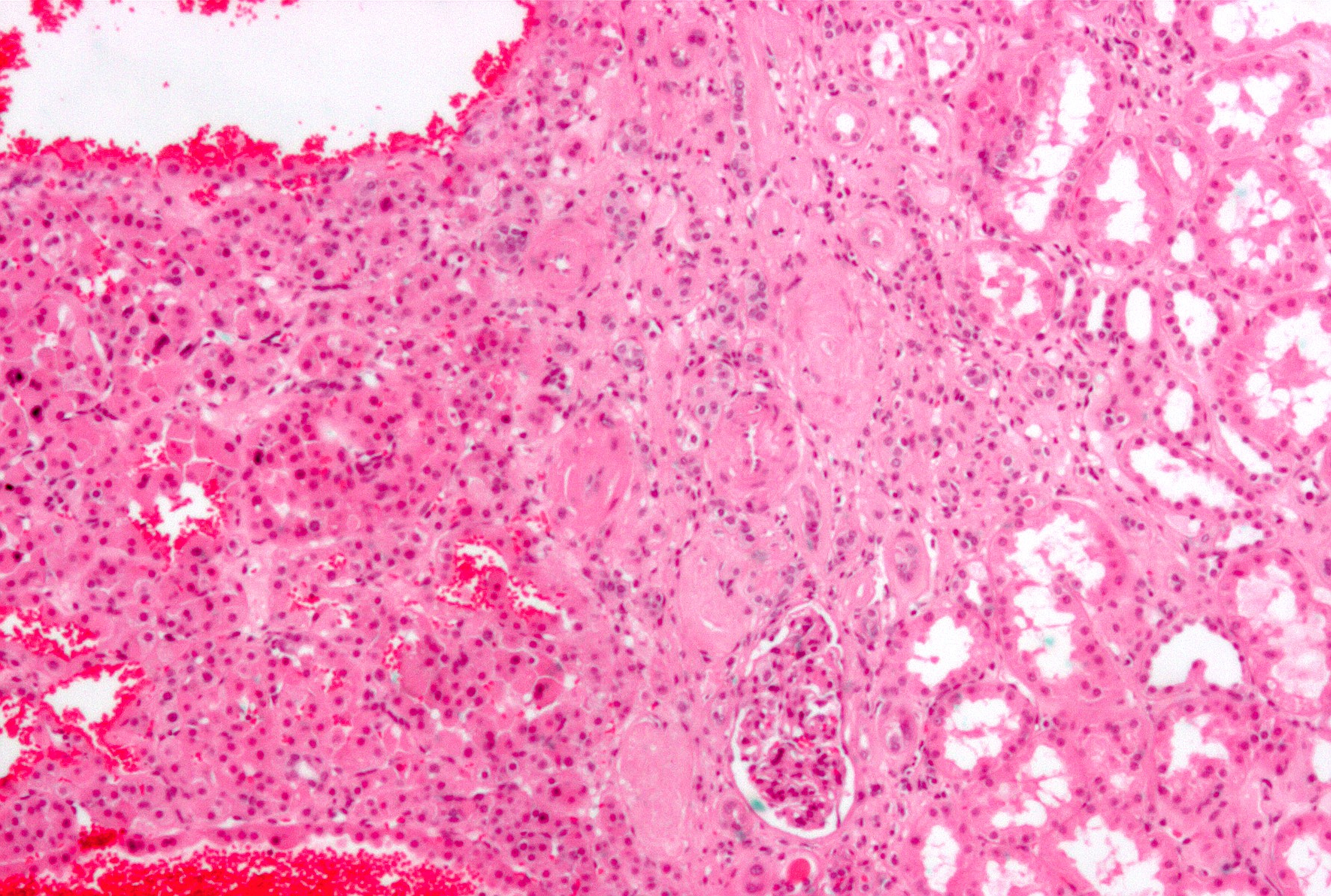
- Micrograph of a renal oncocytoma.

A renal oncocytoma is a benign neoplasm of the kidney made up of oncocytes, epithelial cells with an excess amount of mitochondria.

== Signs and symptoms ==
Renal oncocytoma of the right kidney at CT.

Renal oncocytomas are often asymptomatic and are frequently discovered by chance on a CT or ultrasound of the abdomen. Possible signs and symptoms of a renal oncocytoma include blood in the urine, flank pain, and an abdominal mass.

== Pathophysiology ==
Renal oncocytoma is thought to arise from the intercalated cells of collecting ducts of the kidney. It represent 5% to 15% of surgically resected renal neoplasms. Ultrastructurally, the eosinophilic cells have numerous mitochondria.

=== Histologic appearance ===
An oncocytoma is an epithelial tumor composed of oncocytes, large eosinophilic cells having small, round, benign-appearing nuclei with large nucleoli and excessive amounts of mitochondria.

== Diagnosis ==
Gross appearance of a renal oncocytoma (left of image) and a slice of a normal kidney (right of image). Note the rounded contour, the mahogany colour and the central scar.

In gross appearance, the tumors are tan or mahogany brown, well circumscribed and contain a central scar. They may achieve a large size (up to 12 cm in diameter).

The main differential diagnosis of renal oncocytoma is chromophobe renal cell carcinoma oncocytic variant, which like the renal oncocytoma has eosinophilic cytoplasm, but has perinuclear clearing and some degree of nuclear atypia.

=== Immunohistochemical profile ===
- Cytokeratin AE1/AE3 +
- Vimentin -
- EMA +
- CD10+/-
- CK7 +/- parcellaire
- CK20 -
- CK19 -
- AMACR (Racemase) -
- S100 +
- c-kit (CD117) +
- Cadherin-E +
- TFE3 -
- CAM5.2 +

== Treatment ==
Renal oncocytoma is considered benign, cured by nephrectomy (partial if possible based upon size). There are some familial cases in which these tumors are multicentric rather than solitary. However, they may be resected to exclude a malignant tumor, e.g. renal cell carcinoma.

== Prognosis ==
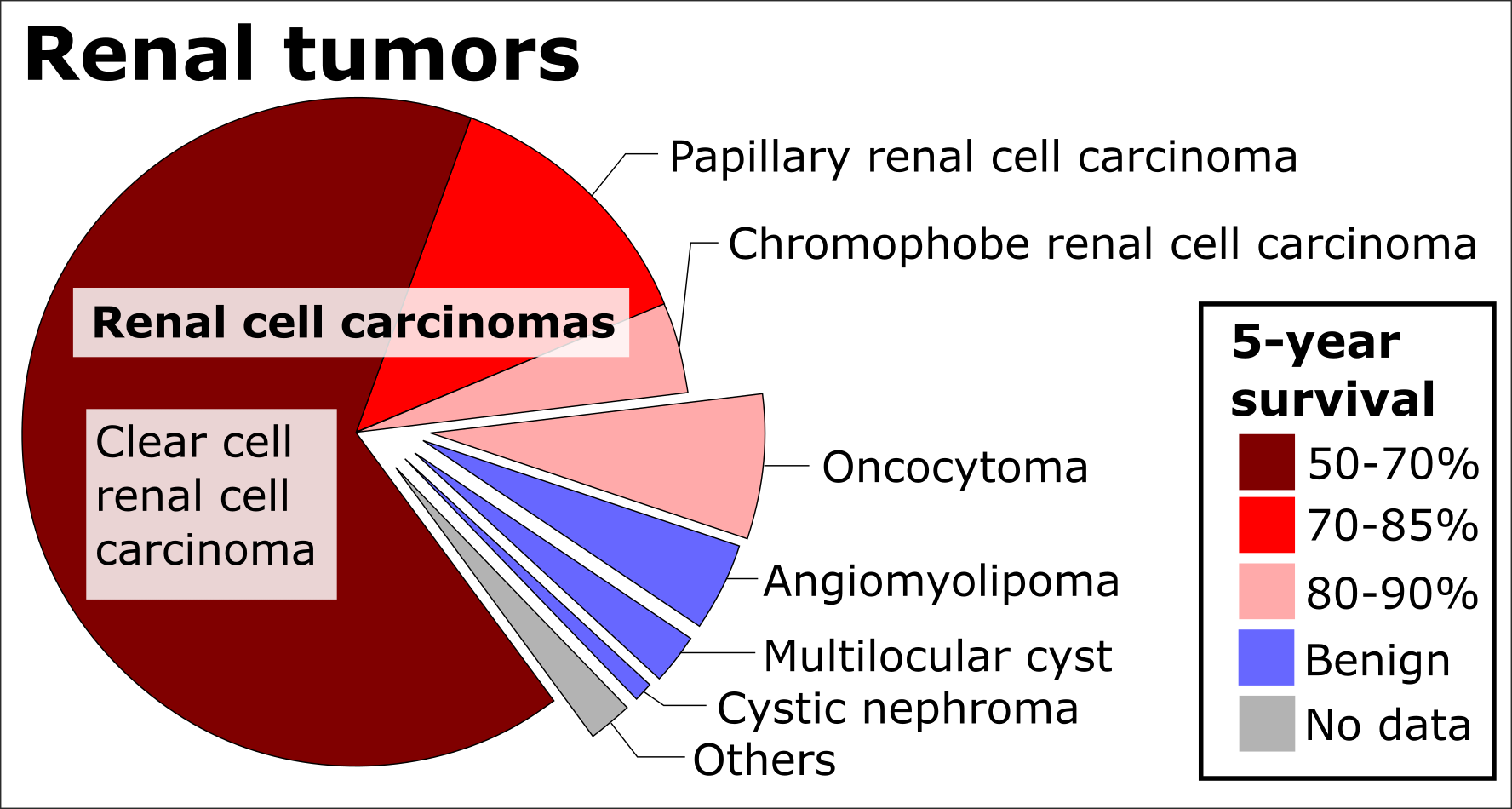
Histopathologic types of kidney tumor, with relative incidences and prognoses. Oncocytoma is seen at right in the pie chart.

The overall five-year survival rate has been estimated to be 63%, with 100% disease-specific survival.

== Additional images ==
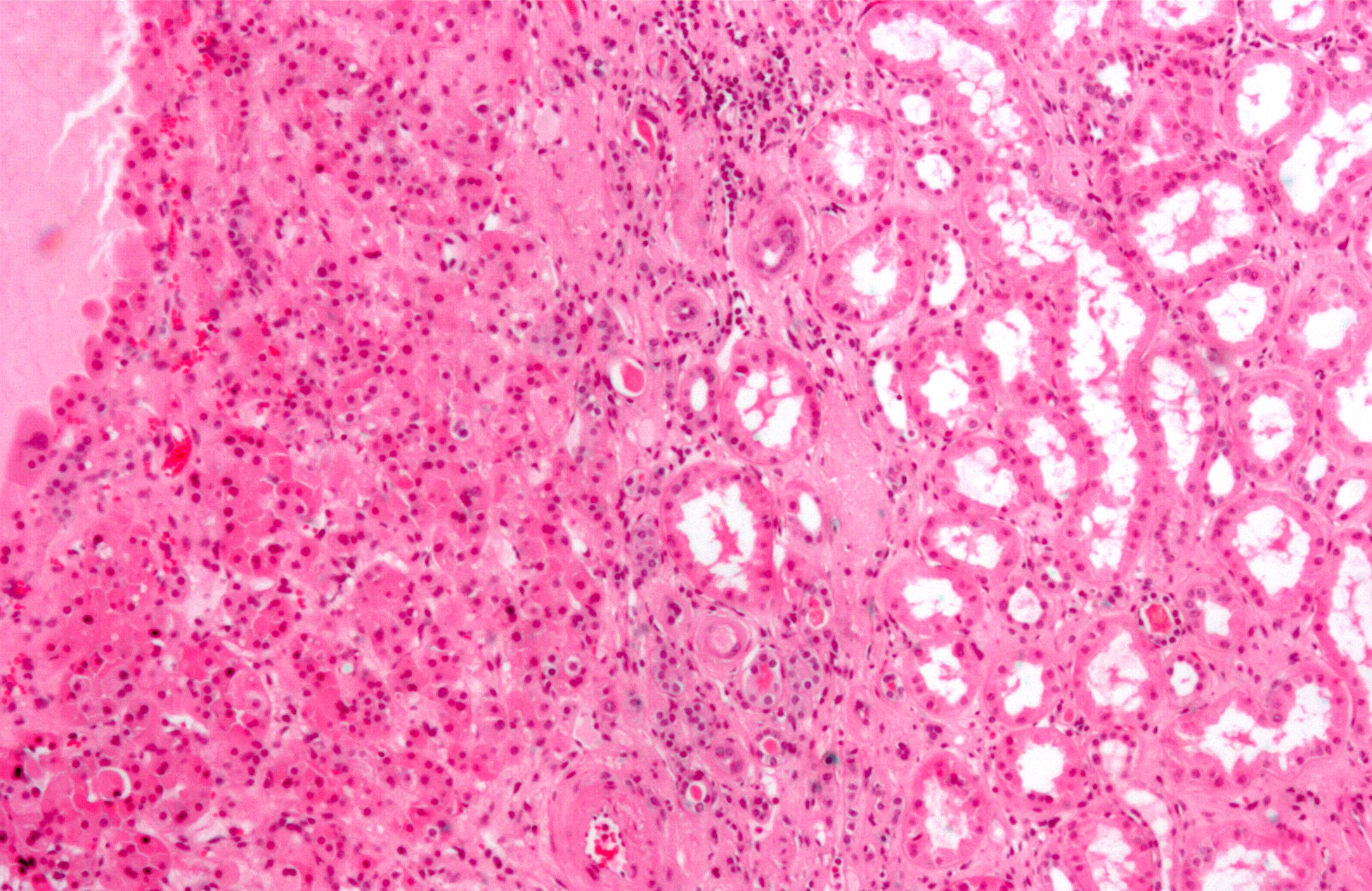
Micrograph of a renal oncocytoma. H&E stain.

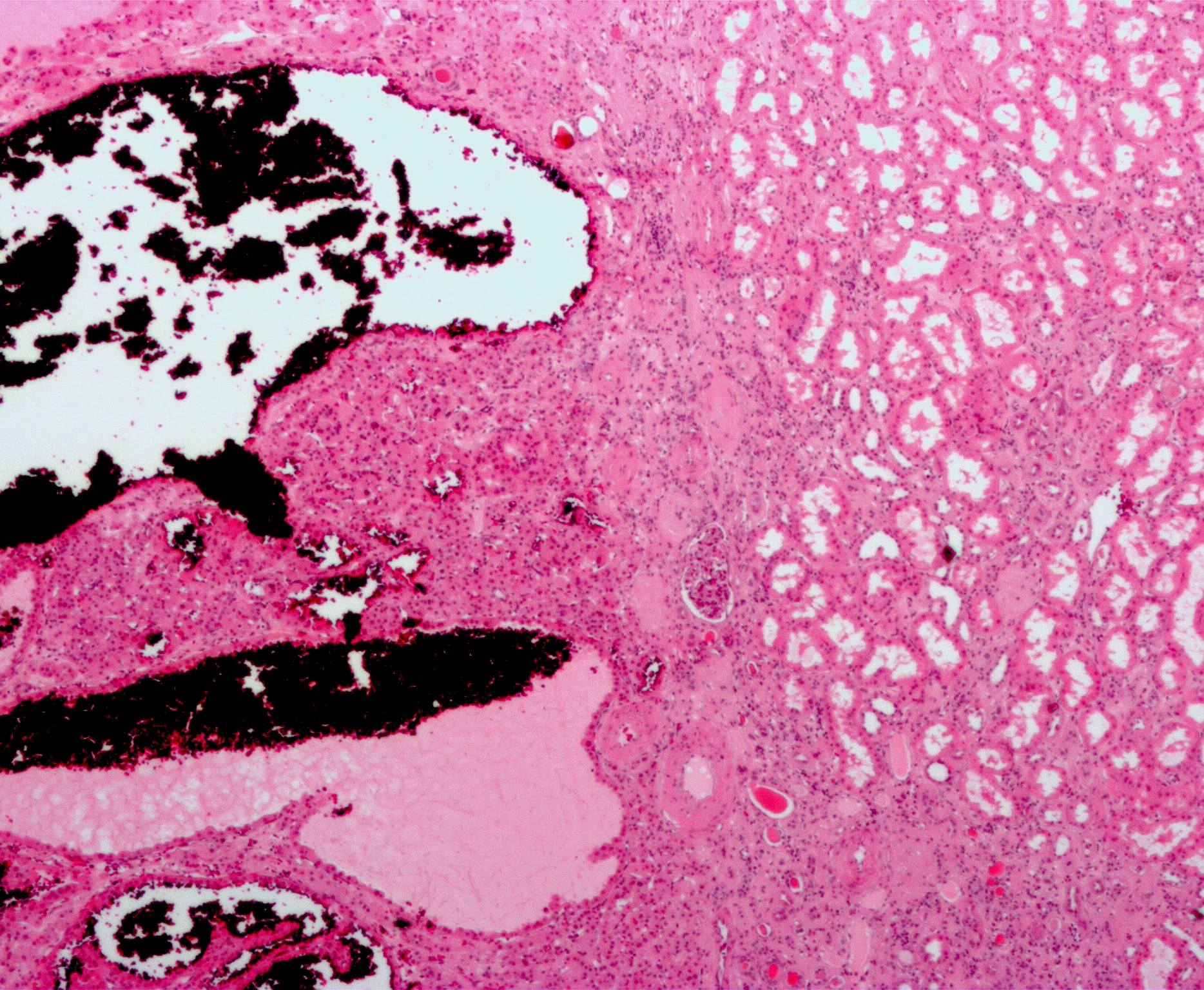
Micrograph of a renal oncocytoma. H&E stain.

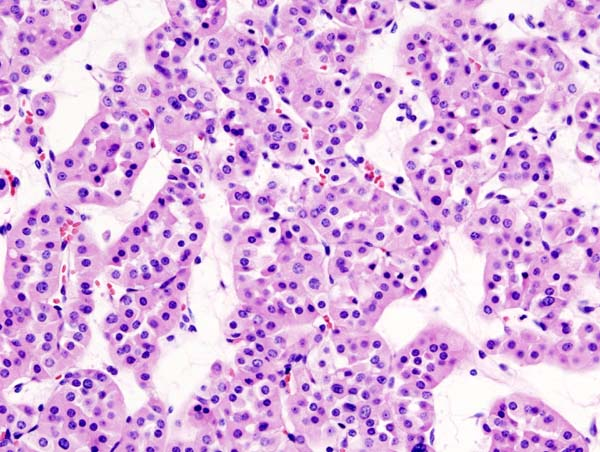
Micrograph of a renal oncocytoma. H&E stain.

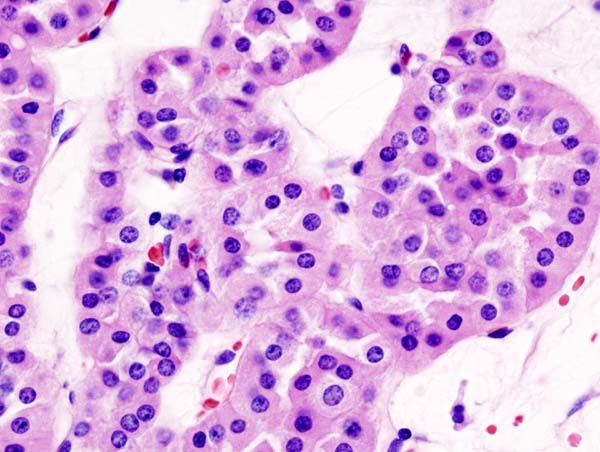
Micrograph of a renal oncocytoma. H&E stain.

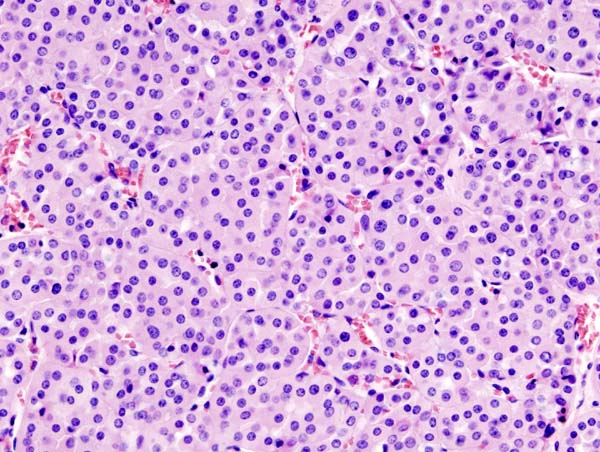
Micrograph of a renal oncocytoma. H&E stain.

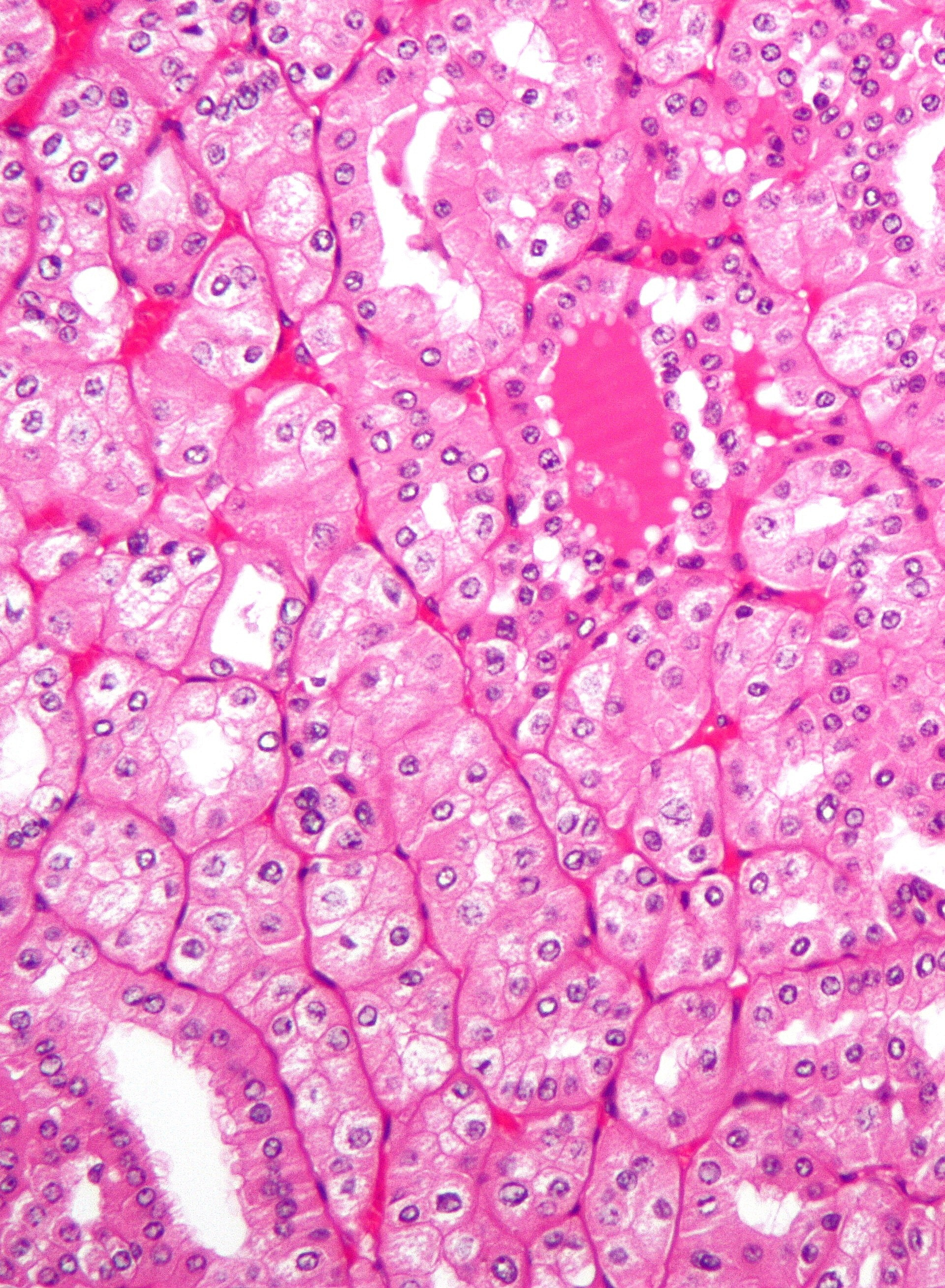
Micrograph of chromophobe RCC oncocytic variant, the main differential diagnosis of renal oncocytoma.

== See also ==
- Kidney
- Kidney tumor
- Renal cell carcinoma
