= Hürthle cell =

Cell in the thyroid gland associated with cancer

- Other names: Askanazy cell
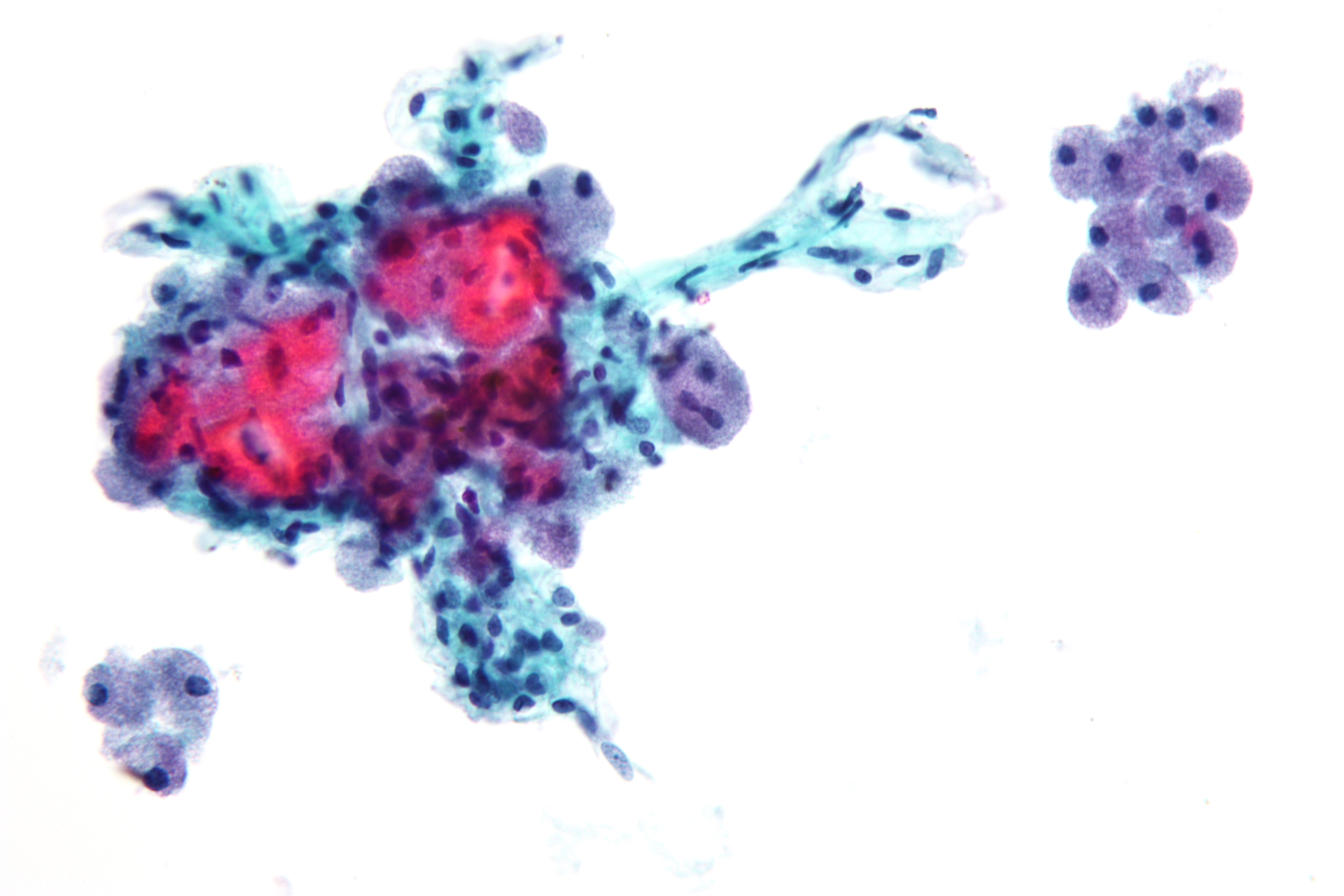
- Micrograph showing Hürthle cells in a Hürthle cell neoplasm. Pap stain.
- Pronunciation: /ˈhɪərtlə/
- Specialty: Pathology

A Hürthle cell is a transformed (metaplasia) thyroid follicular cell with "enlarged mitochondria and enlarged round nuclei with prominent nucleoli", resulting in eosinophilia in the cytoplasm.

Oncocytes in the thyroid are often called Hürthle cells. Although the terms oncocyte, oxyphil cell, and Hürthle cell are used interchangeably, "Hürthle cell" is used only to indicate cells of thyroid follicular origin.

== Diseases ==
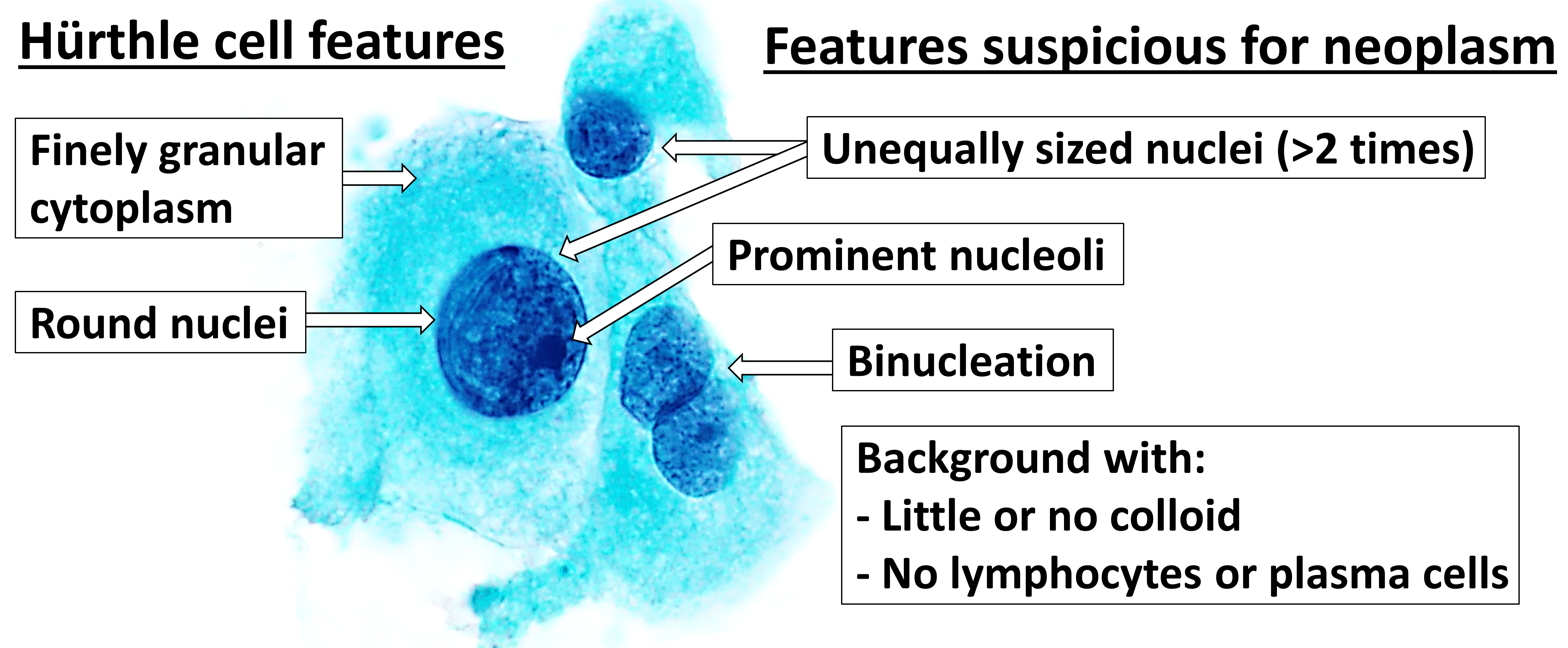
Cytopathology suspicious for Hürthle cell neoplasm (Bethesda category IV, rather than Hürthle cell hyperplasia), Pap stain.

While Hurthle cells can occur in healthy thyroid glands, they are often associated with Hashimoto's thyroiditis and Graves' disease.

Hürthle cell neoplasms can be separated into Hürthle cell adenomas (benign tumours) and carcinomas (malignant tumours) arising from the follicular epithelium of the thyroid gland. The latter is a relatively rare form of differentiated thyroid cancer, accounting for only 3-10% of all differentiated thyroid cancers, and was formerly considered a subtype of follicular thyroid cancer. The mitochondrial DNA of Hürthle cell carcinoma contain somatic mutations. Hürthle cell carcinomas consists of at least 75% Hürthle cells.

== Diagnosis ==
Hürthle cell adenomas are most likely diagnosed much more frequently than Hürthle cell carcinomas.

Typically a painless thyroid mass is found in patients with this type of cancer. As expected, patients with carcinoma usually present larger tumors than patients with adenoma. Rarely, the cancer can spread to the lymph nodes. On few occasions, patients with Hürthle cell carcinoma have distant metastases in the lungs or surrounding bones.

Hürthle cell neoplasms are somewhat difficult to differentiate between being benign or malignant. Since the size and growth pattern of the tumor cannot be used to determine malignancy, although larger tumors have higher incidence of malignancy, Hürthle cell adenomas and carcinomas have to be separated by the presence of both capsular invasion and vascular invasion in the case of carcinomas, or their absence in the case of adenomas. Tumors displaying only capsular invasion tend to behave less aggressively than those with vascular invasion.

Hürthle cell carcinomas are characterized as either minimally invasive or widely invasive tumors. While the minimally invasive or encapsulated carcinoma is fully surrounded by a fibrous capsule, the widely invasive carcinoma shows extensive area of both capsular and vascular invasion with the leftover capsule typically difficult to identify. Classification is important since widely invasive tumors can have outcomes with a 55% mortality rate.

The female to male ratio for Hurthle cell adenomas is 8:1, while the ratio is 2:1 for the malignant version.

Hürthle cell cancer tends to occur in older patients. The median age at diagnosis for Hürthle cell carcinomas is approximately 61 years old.

== Histology ==
Hürthle cells arise from the follicular epithelium. A Hürthle cell is larger than a follicular cell, and polygonal with distinct cell borders. Key features of these oncocytic cells include a granular cytoplasm that stains eosinophilic (pink on H&E stain), which is commonly due to the oncocytes' high content of mitochondria, and a vesicular nucleus with a large nucleolus.

Some of these cells can contain up to 5,000 mitochondria, which fills the cytoplasm to the point of nearly excluding other organelles. This high amount of mitochondria is reported to be a result of mutations in the mitochondrial DNA. Some scientists have identified these mutations as deletions in the mitochondrial DNA of Hürthle cells found in neoplasms and Hashimoto's thyroiditis.

== Treatment ==
A non-minimally invasive Hürthle cell carcinoma is typically treated by a total thyroidectomy followed by radioactive iodine therapy. A Hürthle cell adenoma or a minimally invasive tumor can be treated by a thyroid lobectomy, although some surgeons will perform a total thyroidectomy to prevent the tumor from reappearing and metastasizing. A modified radical neck dissection may be performed for clinically positive lymph nodes.

== History ==
The Hürthle cell is named after German histologist Karl Hürthle, who investigated thyroid secretory function, particularly in dogs. However, this is a misnomer since Hürthle actually described parafollicular C cells. The cell known as the Hürthle cell was first described in 1898 by Max Askanazy, who noted it in patients with Graves' disease.

== See also ==
- Adenoma
- Oncocytoma
- Oxyphil cell
