= Renal medullary fibroma =

- Other names: Renomedullary interstitial cell tumou, medullary fibroma'
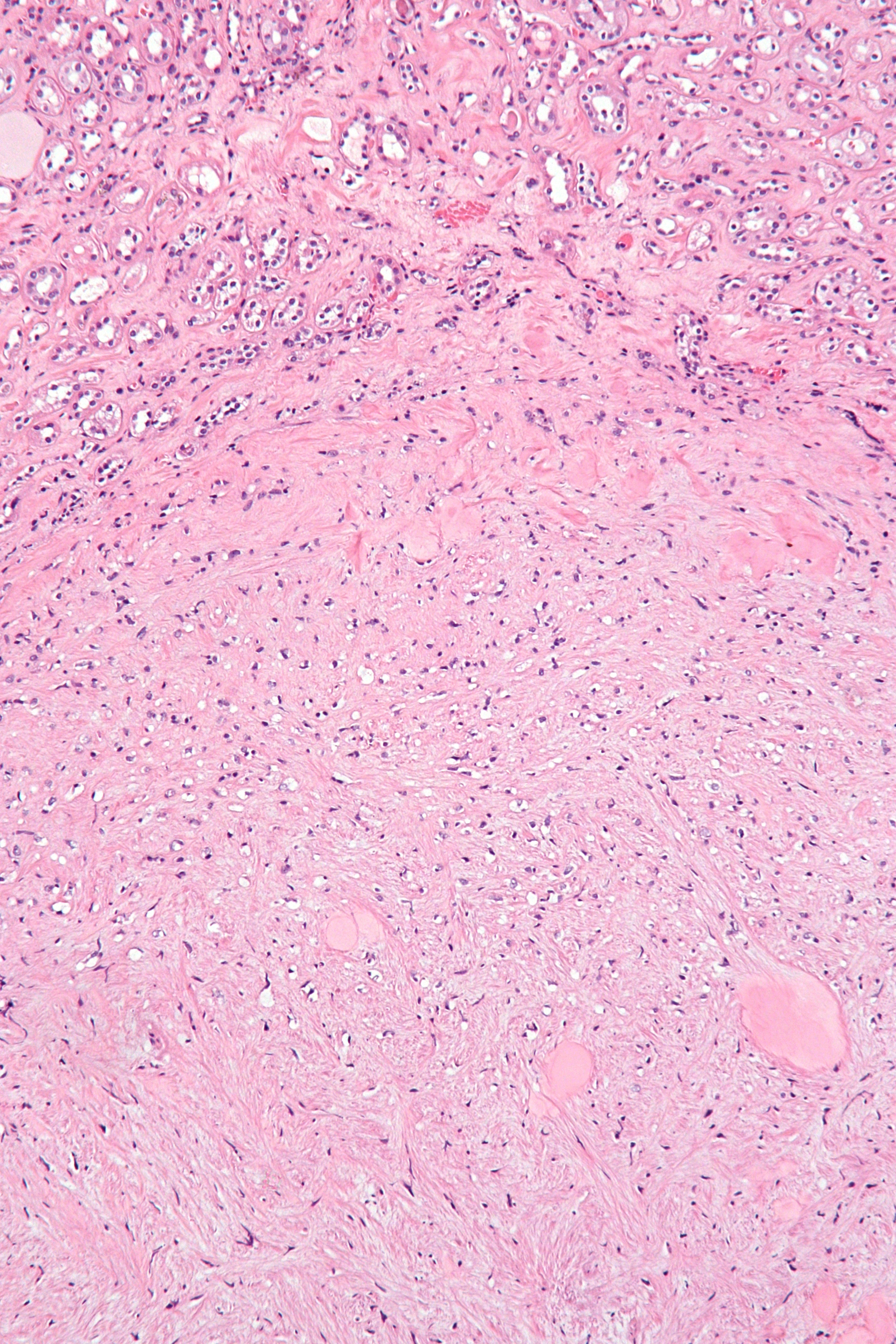
- Micrograph of a renal medullary fibroma (bottom of image). Renal tubules are seen at the top of the image. H&E stain.

Renal medullary fibroma is a benign kidney tumour. It is commonly an incidental finding.

== Signs and symptoms ==
Renal medullary fibromas are typically asymptomatic.

== Diagnosis ==
Renal medullary fibromas are diagnosed by pathologists based on the examination of tissue.

They consist of bland spindle-shaped or stellate-shaped cells in a loose stroma. Renal tubules may be entrapped.

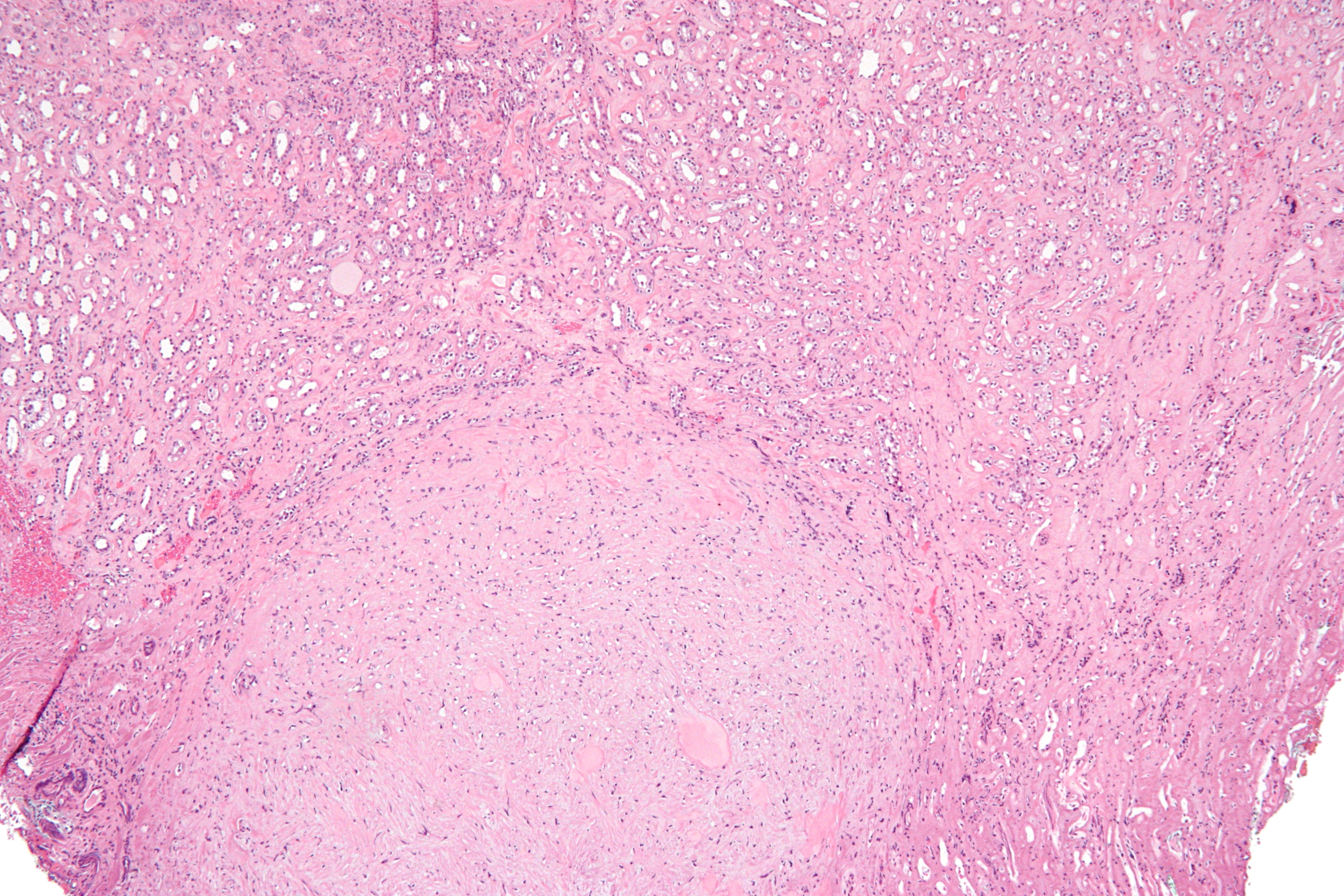
Low mag.

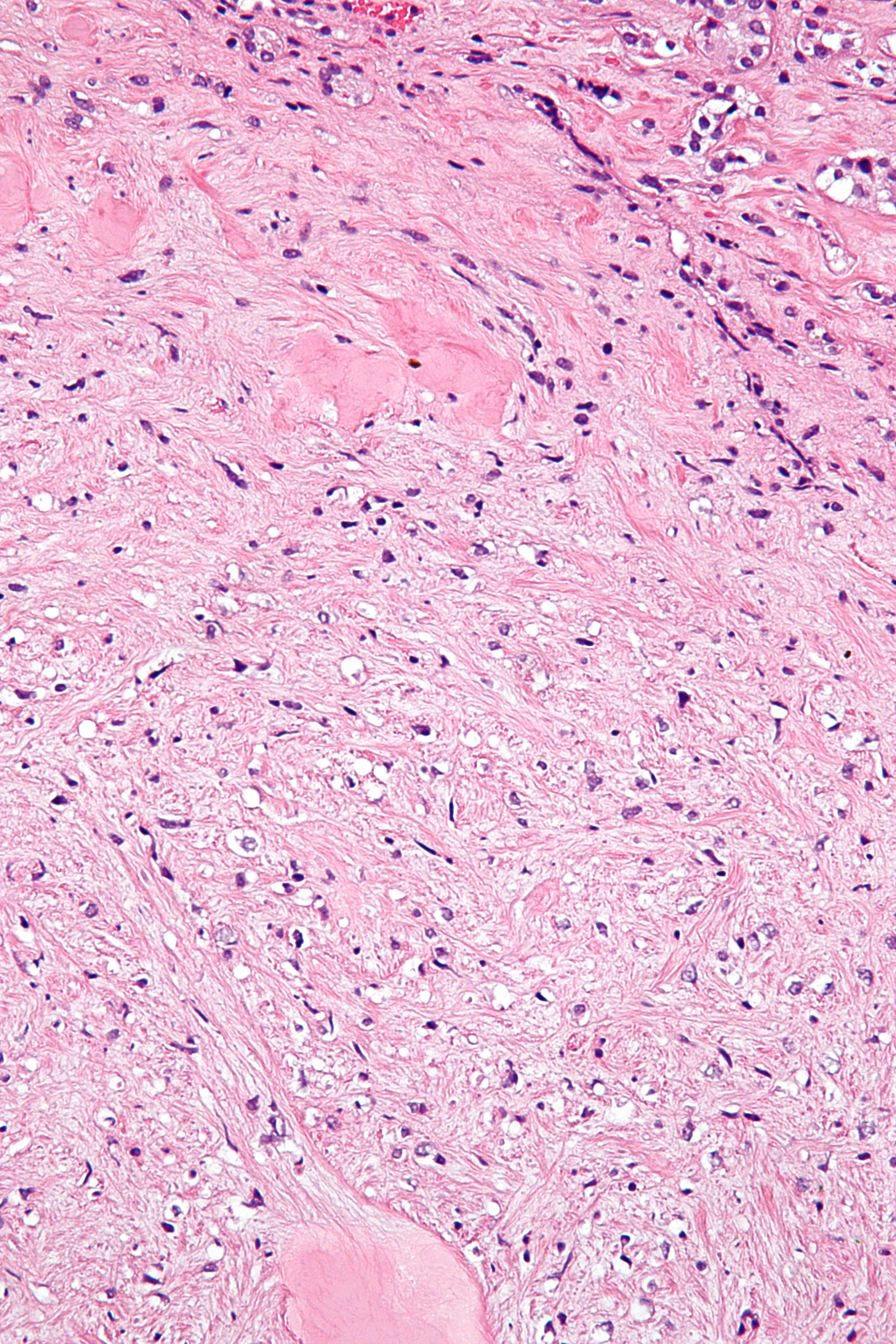
High mag.

== Treatment ==
Generally, no treatment is required.

== See also ==
- Kidney tumour
- Kidney cancer
