= MINPP1 =

Protein-coding gene in the species Homo sapiens

Identifiers
- Aliases: MINPP1, HIPER1, MINPP2, MIPP, multiple inositol-polyphosphate phosphatase 1, PCH16
- External IDs: OMIM: 605391; MGI: 1336159; GeneCards: MINPP1
Enzyme activity
EC #	BRENDA	ExPASy	KEGG	MetaCyc
3.1.3.62	↗	↗	↗	↗
3.1.3.80	↗	↗	↗	↗

Gene location (Human)
Chr.	Chromosome 10 (human)
Band	10q23.2	Start	87,504,875 bp
Band	10q23.2	End	87,553,461 bp

Gene location (Mouse)
Chr.	Chromosome 19 (mouse)
Band	19 C1|19 27.25 cM	Start	32,463,169 bp
Band	19 C1|19 27.25 cM	End	32,492,764 bp
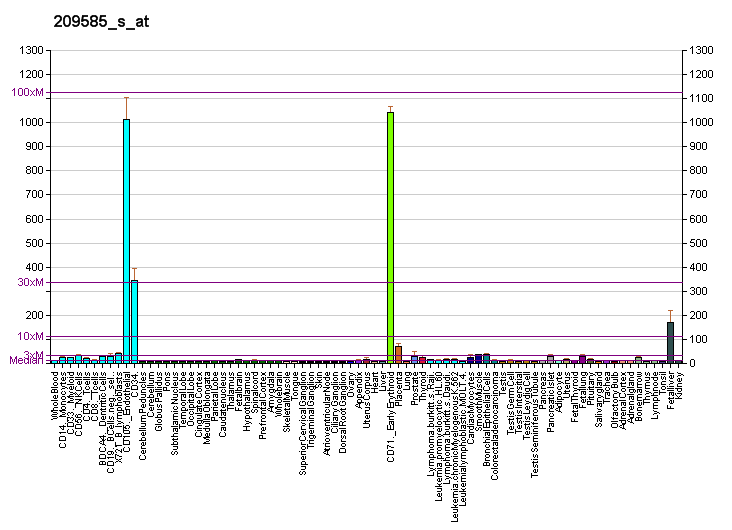
RNA expression pattern
Bgee	Human / Mouse (ortholog); Top expressed in: trabecular bone; tibia; islet of Langerhans; Epithelium of choroid plexus; jejunal mucosa; right adrenal cortex; gonad; kidney tubule; left adrenal gland; stromal cell of endometrium / Top expressed in: fetal liver hematopoietic progenitor cell; abdominal wall; primitive streak; molar; seminal vesicula; endocardial cushion; skin of back; decidua; epiblast; right kidney; More reference expression data
BioGPS	More reference expression data
Gene ontology
Molecular function	phosphatase activity; bisphosphoglycerate 3-phosphatase activity; inositol-hexakisphosphate phosphatase activity; hydrolase activity; inositol-1,3,4,5,6-pentakisphosphate 3-phosphatase activity; inositol-1,3,4,5-tetrakisphosphate 3-phosphatase activity; inositol hexakisphosphate 2-phosphatase activity; acid phosphatase activity; inositol phosphate phosphatase activity; protein histidine phosphatase activity
Cellular component	endoplasmic reticulum lumen; endoplasmic reticulum; extracellular exosome
Biological process	bone mineralization; polyphosphate metabolic process; inositol phosphate metabolic process; ossification; dephosphorylation; protein dephosphorylation
Sources:Amigo / QuickGO
Orthologs
Databases	NCBI: entry; OMA: entry
Species	Human	Mouse
Entrez	9562	17330
Ensembl	ENSG00000107789	ENSMUSG00000024896
UniProt	Q9UNW1	Q9Z2L6
RefSeq (mRNA)	NM_001178117; NM_001178118; NM_004897	NM_010799
RefSeq (protein)	NP_001171588; NP_001171589; NP_004888	NP_034929
Location (UCSC)	Chr 10: 87.5 – 87.55 Mb	Chr 19: 32.46 – 32.49 Mb
PubMed search
- Wikidata
View/Edit Human	View/Edit Mouse

Multiple inositol polyphosphate phosphatase 1 is an enzyme that in humans is encoded by the MINPP1 gene.

MINPP1 hydrolyzes the abundant metabolites inositol pentakisphosphate and inositol hexakisphosphate and, like PTEN (MIM 601728), has the ability to remove 3-phosphate from inositol phosphate substrates.[supplied by OMIM]
