= Follicular thyroid cancer =

Malignant tumor made of hormone-producing cells in the thyroid gland

- Other names: Follicular thyroid carcinoma
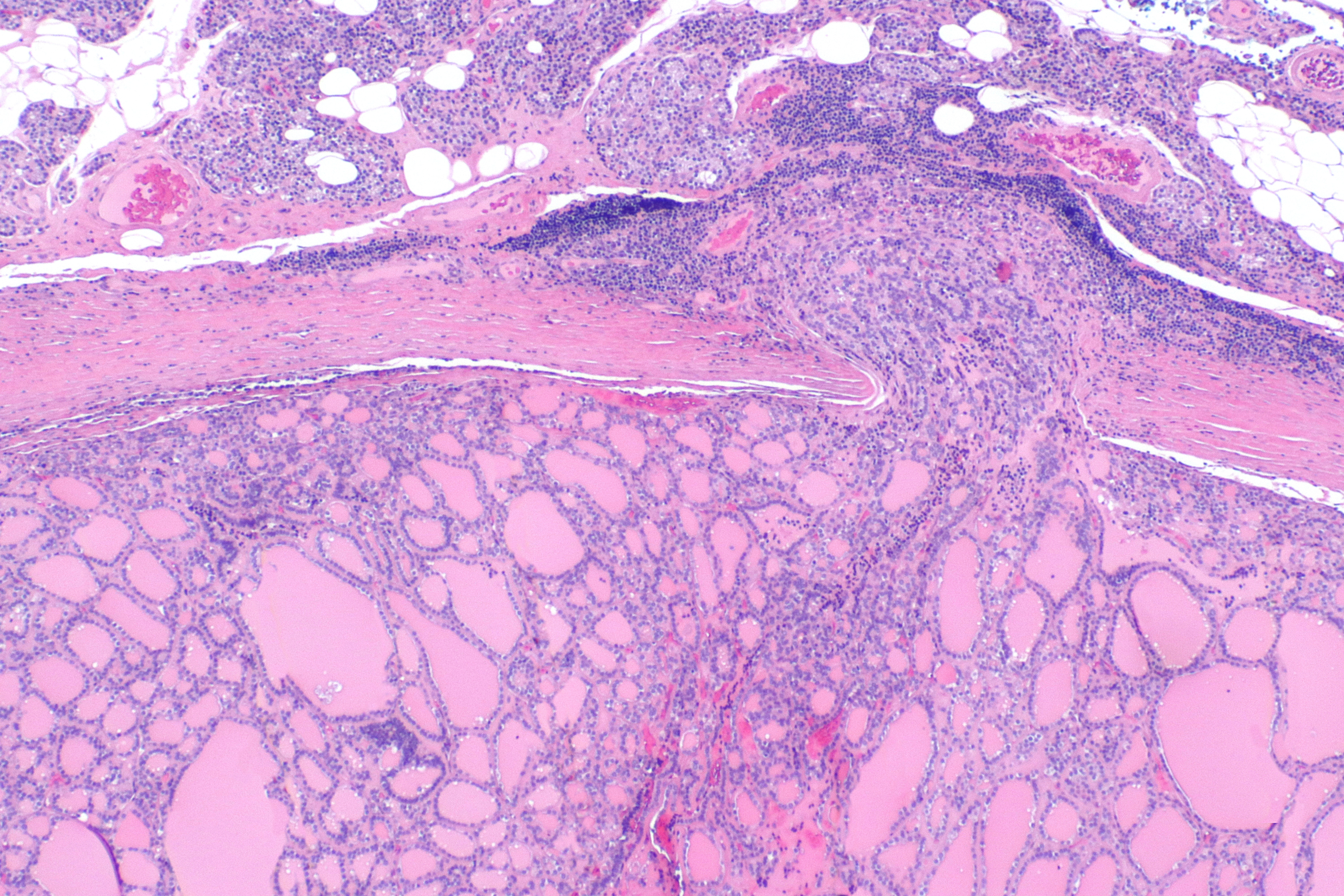
- Micrograph of follicular thyroid carcinoma showing a location where the cancer grows through the fibrous capsule. H&E stain.
- Specialty: ENT surgery, oncology

Follicular thyroid cancer accounts for 15% of thyroid cancer and occurs more commonly in women over 50 years of age. Thyroglobulin (Tg) can be used as a tumor marker for well-differentiated follicular thyroid cancer. Thyroid follicular cells are the thyroid cells responsible for the production and secretion of thyroid hormones.

== Cause ==
=== Associated mutations ===
Approximately one-half of follicular thyroid carcinomas have mutations in the Ras subfamily of oncogenes, most notably HRAS, NRAS, and KRAS. Mutations in MINPP1 have likewise been observed, as well as germline PTEN gene mutations responsible for Cowden syndrome of which follicular thyroid cancer is a feature. Also, a chromosomal translocation specific for follicular thyroid carcinomas is one between paired box gene 8 (PAX-8), a gene important in thyroid development, and the gene encoding peroxisome proliferator-activated receptor γ 1 (PPARγ1), a nuclear hormone receptor contributing to terminal differentiation of cells. The PAX8-PPARγ1 fusion is present in approximately one-third of follicular thyroid carcinomas, specifically those cancers with a t(2;3)(q13;p25) translocation, permitting juxtaposition of portions of both genes. This subtype may potentially be treated with pioglitazone, a thiazolidinedione-class drug that potentiates PPARγ to boost insulin sensitivity. Tumors tend to carry either a RAS mutation or a PAX8-PPARγ1 fusion, and only rarely are both genetic abnormalities present in the same case. Thus, follicular thyroid carcinomas seem to arise by two distinct and virtually nonoverlapping molecular pathways.

== Hurthle cell variant ==
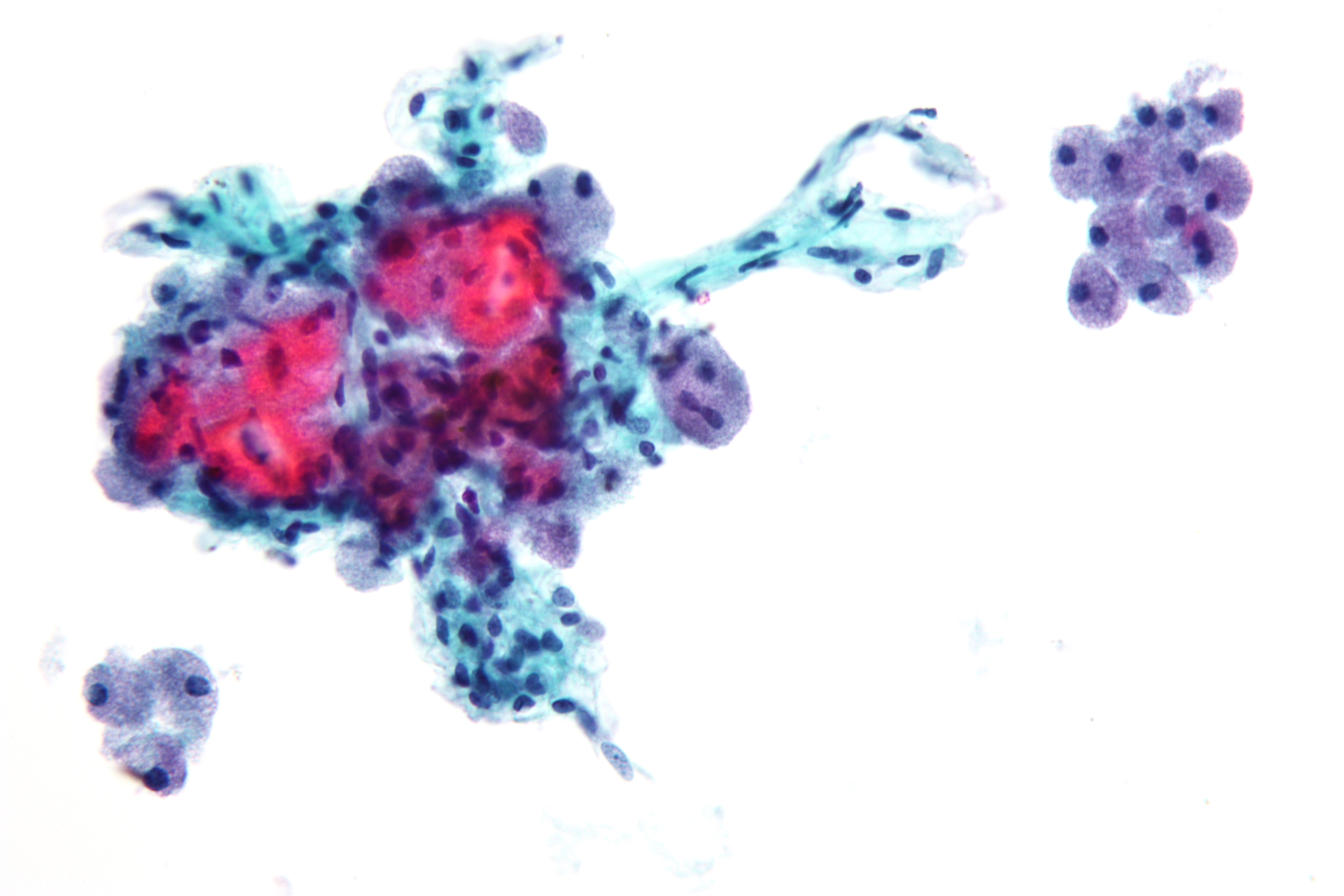
Micrograph of a Hurthle cell neoplasm.

Hurthle cell thyroid cancer is often considered a variant of follicular cell carcinoma. Hurthle cell forms are more likely than follicular carcinomas to be bilateral and multifocal and to metastasize to lymph nodes. Like follicular carcinoma, unilateral hemithyroidectomy is performed for non-invasive disease, and total thyroidectomy for invasive disease.

== Diagnosis ==
It is difficult to correctly diagnose follicular neoplasms (FNs) on fine-needle aspiration cytology (FNAC) because it shares many cytological features with other mimicking lesions.

=== Classification ===
It is impossible to distinguish between follicular adenoma and carcinoma on cytological grounds. If fine needle aspiration cytology (FNAC) suggests follicular neoplasm, thyroid lobectomy should be performed to establish the histopathological diagnosis. Features sine qua non for the diagnosis of follicular carcinoma are capsular invasion and vascular invasion by tumor cells. Still, focuses of the capsular invasion should be carefully evaluated and discriminated from the capsular rupture due to FNA penetration resulting in WHAFFT (worrisome histologic alterations following FNA of thyroid).

- Follicular carcinoma tends to metastasize to lung and bone via the bloodstream.
- Papillary thyroid carcinoma commonly metastasizes to cervical lymph nodes.

HMGA2 has been proposed as a marker to identify malignant tumors.

== Treatment ==
Treatment is usually surgical, followed by radioiodine.

=== Initial treatment ===
- If follicular cells are found on cytological testing, it is common to carry out hemithyroidectomy to distinguish between follicular adenoma and follicular carcinoma on histopathological examination, proceeding to completion thyroidectomy and postoperative radioiodine ablation where carcinoma is confirmed. This way total thyroidectomy is not carried out unnecessarily.
- Thyroidectomy is invariably followed by radioiodine treatment at levels from 50 to 200 millicuries following two weeks of a low iodine diet (LID). Occasionally treatment must be repeated if annual scans indicate remaining cancerous tissue. Some physicians favor administering the maximum safe dose (calculated based on a number of factors), while others favor administering smaller doses, which may still be effective in ablating all thyroid tissue. I-131 is used for ablation of the thyroid tissue.
  - Minimally invasive thyroidectomy has been used in recent years in cases where the nodules are small.

=== Finding disease recurrence ===
Some studies have shown that thyroglobulin (Tg) testing combined with neck ultrasound is more productive in finding disease recurrence than full- or whole-body scans (WBS) using radioactive iodine. However, current protocol (in the USA) suggests a small number of clean annual WBS are required before relying on Tg testing plus neck ultrasound. When needed, whole body scans consist of withdrawal from thyroxine medication and/or injection of recombinant human Thyroid stimulating hormone (TSH). In both cases, a low iodine diet regimen must also be followed to optimize the takeup of the radioactive iodine dose. Low dose radioiodine of a few millicuries is administered. Full body nuclear medicine scan follows using a gamma camera. Scan doses of radioactive iodine may be I^{131} or I^{123}.

Recombinant human TSH, commercial name Thyrogen, is produced in cell culture from genetically engineered hamster cells.

== Prognosis ==
The overall 5-year survival rate for follicular thyroid cancer is 91%, and the 10-year survival rate is 85%.

By overall cancer staging into stages I to IV, follicular thyroid cancer has a 5-year survival rate of 100% for stages I and II, 71% for stage III, and 50% for stage IV.

Compared to other variants of Follicular cell derived thyroid cancer, bone metastases are commonly associated with follicular carcinoma. In the present study a high rate of bone metastases of 34% was observed.
