= Karl Hürthle =

German physiologist

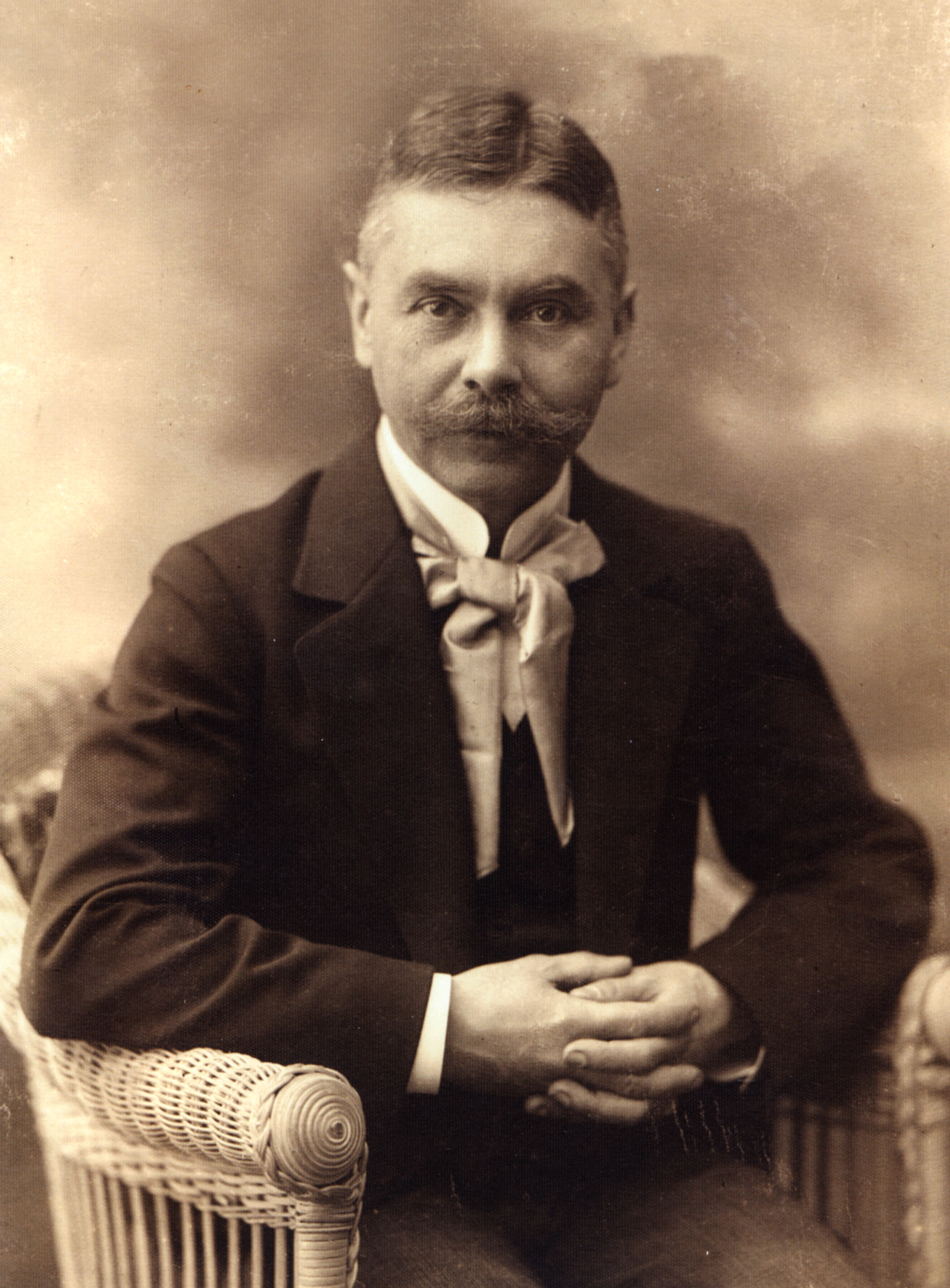
Karl Hürthle (1860-1945)

Karl Hürthle (March 16, 1860 – March 23, 1945) was a German physiologist and histologist who was a native of Ludwigsburg.

In 1884, he received his doctorate from the University of Tübingen, where he remained until 1886, working as a prosector at the anatomical institute. At Tübingen, he was a student and assistant to physiologists Karl von Vierordt (1818-1884) and Paul Grützner (1847-1919). In 1887, he became an assistant to Rudolf Heidenhain (1834-1897) at the physiological institute in Breslau, and in 1895 attained the title of professor extraordinarius. In 1898, he succeeded Heidenhain at the department of physiology in Breslau.

Later in his career, he worked at the physiological institute at Tübingen, and also in the department of experimental pathology and therapy at the Kerckhoff Institute in Bad Nauheim (now known as the Max Planck Institute for Heart and Lung Research).

Hürthle is remembered for contributions made in the field of haemodynamics. He performed extensive research involving blood pressure, blood viscosity, intracranial circulation, blood supply of organs, vasodilatation, and a phenomenon he called Windkesseleffekt, of which he demonstrated plays an important role in the maintenance of blood pressure.

He also described the motion phenomena of the arterial vascular wall, performed studies involving the structure of striated muscle, and investigated the function and morphology of the thyroid gland. A large, granular epithelial cell sometimes found in the thyroid is called a "Hürthle cell".

== Selected publications ==
- Zur Technik der Untersuchung des Blutdruckes (Studies involving blood pressure), 1888
- Untersuchungen über die Innervation der Hirngefäße (Studies on the innervation of brain vessels), 1889
- Ueber eine Methode zur Registrierung des arteriellen Blutdrucks beim Menschen (A method for registration of arterial blood pressure in humans), 1896
- Über die Struktur der querstreiftem Muskelfasern von Hydrophilus 1909
- Histologische Struktur und optische Eigenschaften der Muskeln (Histological structure and optical properties of muscles), 1925
- Blutkreislauf im Gehirn (Blood circulation in the brain), 1927
- Die mittlere Blutversorgung der einzelnen Organe (The average blood supply to the individual organs), 1927
- Über tonische und pulsatorische Bewegungen der Arterienwand (About tonic and pulsatory movements of the arterial wall), 1939
