= Max Askanazy =

German-Swiss pathologist (1865–1940)

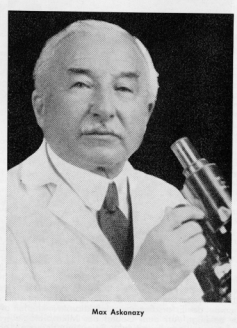
Max Askanazy (1865-1940)

Max Askanazy (24 February 1865, Stallupönen, East Prussia – 23 October 1940, Geneva, Switzerland) was a German-Swiss pathologist.

In 1890 he received his medical doctorate from the University of Königsberg, where he worked for several years in its pathological institute. In 1903 he obtained the title of professor. In 1905 he succeeded Friedrich Wilhelm Zahn (1845–1904), as professor of general pathology at the University of Geneva, a position he maintained until 1939.

Askanazy made contributions in the fields of hematology and parasitology, also conducting important research of bone pathology and the formation of tumors in humans. In 1898 he was the first scientist to describe Hürthle cells, and in 1904 he was the first to link osteitis fibrosa cystica with parathyroid tumors. In 1921, he provided an early description of Schaumann bodies (kalkdrusen), and two years later, he was the first to describe a gastric carcinoid tumor.

In 1928, he founded the Société internationale de pathologie géographique (The International Society for Geographical Pathology), which would play an important role in the formation of the epidemiology of cancer.

== Written works ==
He was the author of around 170 scientific works; the following are a few of his principal writings:

- Zur Regeneration der quergestreiften Muskelfasern, 1890 – For the regeneration of muscle fibers.
- Ueber Ostitis deformans ohne osteoides Gewebe. Arbeiten aus dem pathologisch-anatomischen Institut zu Tübingen, 1904, 4. 398-422 - On osteitis deformans without osteoid tissue.
- Pathologische Anatomie : Ein Lehrbuch für Studierende und Ärzte, 1911 – Pathological anatomy: a textbook for students and physicians.
- Blut, Knochenmark, Lymphknoten, Milz. 1 Handbuch der speziellen pathologischen Anatomie und Histologie/ Bd. 1, T. 1, Blut, Lymphknoten / edited by Max Askanazy, 1926 - Blood, bone marrow, lymph nodes, spleen.
