= Squamous-cell carcinoma of the thyroid =

- Other names: Thyroid squamous-cell carcinoma, squamous-cell thyroid carcinoma
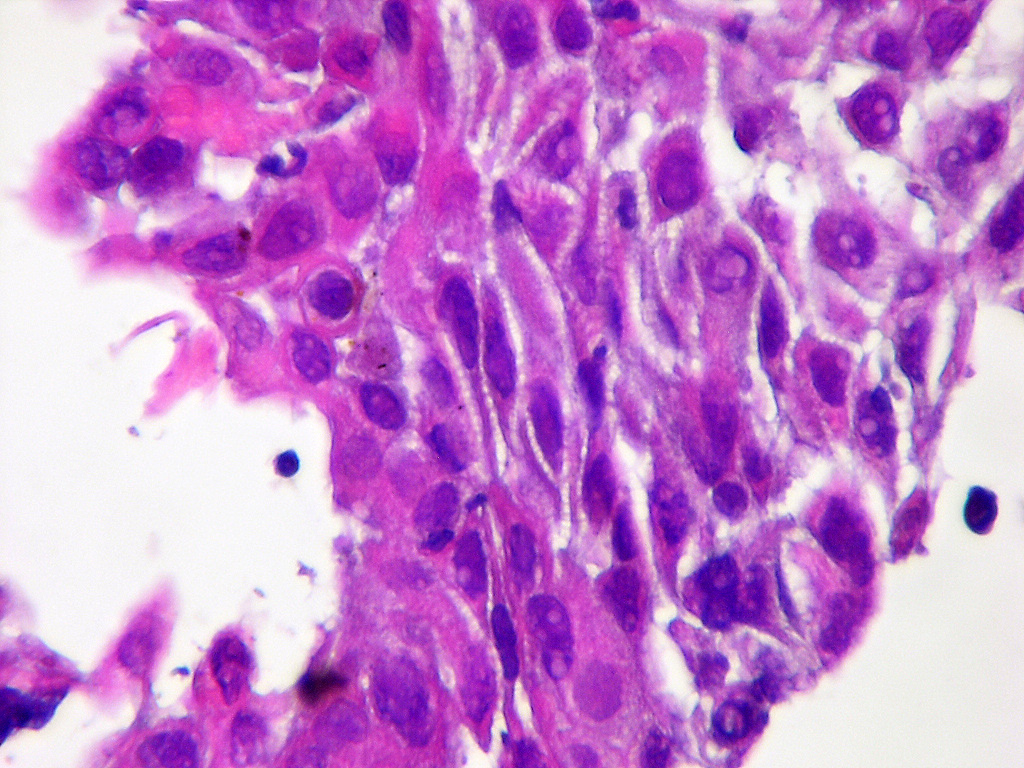
- Micrograph of squamous-cell carcinoma (H&E stain)
- Specialty: Oncology

Squamous-cell carcinoma of the thyroid, or thyroid squamous-cell carcinoma, is a rare malignant neoplasm of the thyroid gland which shows tumor cells with distinct squamous differentiation. It comprises less than 1% of all thyroid malignancies.

== Pathophysiology ==
Squamous epithelial cells are not normally found in the thyroid, and the origin of squamous-cell carcinoma of the thyroid remains unclear. Three main theories have been proposed:

- Embryonic remnants – Residual squamous epithelial cells from the thyroglossal duct, ultimobranchial body, or thymic epithelium of the third branchial cleft may undergo malignant transformation. However, this theory is challenged by the observation that most cases originate in the lateral lobes rather than the pyramidal lobe, which is the structure most closely associated with the thyroglossal duct.
- Squamous metaplasia – Follicular epithelial cells may undergo squamous metaplasia in response to chronic inflammation or existing neoplasms. This theory is controversial, as Hashimoto's thyroiditis and chronic lymphocytic thyroiditis, conditions known to exhibit squamous metaplasia, are not typically associated with squamous-cell carcinoma of the thyroid.
- Dedifferentiation – The carcinoma may represent a stage in the dedifferentiation of an existing papillary, medullary, or anaplastic thyroid carcinoma. Up to 40% of papillary thyroid cancers contain regions of squamous cell population, supporting this hypothesis.

The histopathology shows tumor cells with squamous differentiation.

== Diagnosis ==
Squamous-cell carcinoma of the thyroid is a biologically aggressive malignant neoplasm which is associated with rapid growth of neck mass followed by infiltration of thyroid-adjacent structures. Patients usually demonstrate dysphagia, dyspnea and voice changes, as well as local pain in the neck.

The tools required to diagnose primary squamous cell carcinoma of the thyroid are panendoscopy, CT scan or PET-CT and immunohistological analysis.

== Treatment ==
Thyroidectomy and neck dissection show good results in early stages of squamous-cell carcinoma of the thyroid. However, due to highly aggressive phenotype, surgical treatment is not always possible. It is refractory to radioiodine treatment. Radiotherapy might be effective in certain cases, resulting in relatively better survival rate and quality of life. Vincristine, doxorubicin and bleomycin are used for adjuvant chemotherapy, but their effects are not good enough according to publications.

== Prognosis ==
Squamous-cell carcinoma of the thyroid exhibits a highly aggressive phenotype, thus prognosis of that malignancy is extremely poor. The overall survival is less than 1 year in most of cases.
