= NIFTP =

NIFTP can refer to

- National Institute of Fashion Technology Patna
- Network-Independent File Transfer Protocol, one of the Coloured Book protocols
- Noninvasive follicular thyroid neoplasm with papillary-like nuclear features - a tumour previously classified as papillary thyroid carcinoma
