= Active surveillance =

Active surveillance may refer to:

- Active surveillance of prostate cancer
- Active surveillance of low-risk papillary thyroid microcarcinoma
