= Active surveillance of low-risk papillary thyroid microcarcinoma =

Active surveillance is an observational management being increasingly accepted as an alternative over immediate surgery due to low-risk papillary thyroid microcarcinoma with no evidence of extension or metastatic spread. Patients on active surveillance are observed with periodical ultrasound examinations and thyroid function tests. If disease progression is detected, patients are treated with surgery. The chances of thyroid cancer increased during the past 3 decades in many countries, mostly due to increased detection of small papillary thyroid carcinoma, without associated increase in mortality from thyroid cancer.

Therefore, researchers declared a warning of increased overdiagnosis and overtreatment for thyroid cancer. Akira Miyauchi proposed active surveillance management in 1993, when he was an associate professor of Department of Surgery, Kagawa Medical University (now Kagawa University Faculty of Medicine) and a registered doctor at Kuma Hospital (Kobe, Hyogo Prefecture, Japan).

== History ==
The incidence of thyroid cancer has rapidly increased since the 1980s. However, most of them are microcarcinoma, which are small papillary carcinomas that has a diameter of 1 centimeter or smaller. Although thyroid cancer increased, mortality from thyroid cancer remained stable. Therefore, some researchers started warning of overdiagnosis and overtreatment of small papillary thyroid carcinoma. The cause of this phenomenon is the widespread adoption of imaging modalities, such as ultrasonography, CT scan, MRI, and fine-needle aspiration cytology (FNAC). With these technologies, detection and diagnosis of small cancers became possible, which were previously not possible.

Many autopsy reports on subjects who had died of non-thyroid diseases reported high incidences of small thyroid cancers, tagged as “latent thyroid cancers.” The incidence of latent thyroid cancers 3 mm or larger is reported to be 3% to 6%. Most are of papillary carcinoma type. Papillary thyroid carcinoma 3 mm or lager can be detected, and easily diagnosed using ultrasound-guided FNAC. A screening study for thyroid cancer on Japanese adult women using ultrasonography and ultrasound guided FNAC reported 3.5% of the subjects having small thyroid cancer. This incidence was almost consistent with that of latent cancer at autopsies and was more than 1000 times the prevalence of clinical thyroid cancer in Japanese women being reported at the time.

Considering all these facts, Akira Miyauchi proposed the following hypothesis: “Most papillary microcarcinomas stay small and harmless. It will not be too late to perform surgery only for those that show marginal progression during observational management. Performing surgery for all microcarcinoma may result in more harm than good.” With due consideration, he proposed an observational management clinical trial at the Medical Meeting of Kuma Hospital. His proposal was approved and the study for low-risk papillary microcarcinoma began in the same year. The management was termed active surveillance. In 1995, a similar trial was begun at Cancer Institute Hospital of Japanese Foundation for Cancer Research (JFCR) in Tokyo, Japan.

Active surveillance was conducted for 1,235 patients at Kuma Hospital for an average period of 5 years and 409 patients at Cancer Institute Hospital of JFCR for an average period of 6.8 years. The results of the trials in these institutes were cancer growth by 3 mm or more in 10 years in 7% to 8% of the patients and metastasis to cervical lymph node in 1% to 4% of the patients. There were no patients who developed distant metastasis, or died of thyroid cancer. None of those who underwent conversion surgery had recurrence of the disease. Active surveillance was performed in the United States, South Korea, Italy and Colombia. Through these surveillance managements, a small number of patients had disease progression, while the majority of the patients had stable disease, as observed in Japan.

Even after surgery on patients with low-risk papillary thyroid microcarcinoma by well-experienced thyroid surgeons, complications such as temporary vocal cord paralysis, permanent vocal cord paralysis, temporary hypoparathyroidism, permanent hypoparathyroidism developed with the incidence of 4.1%, 0.2%, 16.7% and 1.6%, respectively. The incidences of such unfavorable events was significantly higher in the group of immediate surgery than in the group of active surveillance. Also, the proportions of patients requiring thyroid hormone medications and those having scars due to thyroid surgery was significantly higher in the group of immediate surgery than the group of active surveillance. In addition, the 10-year medical care costs for the patients undergoing immediate surgery was 4.1 times the costs for those who chose active surveillance.

One may have an opinion that watching the progress without surgery may cause psychological concerns such as anxiety in the patients. Davie L. et al. conducted a questionnaire survey on patients under active surveillance at Kuma Hospital, and reported that 37% of the patients sometimes had cancer concerns, but 60% of them said such anxiety diminished over time. Very importantly, 83% of the patients responded that choosing active surveillance was their best choice. The comparison between the immediate surgery group and the active surveillance group showed that the immediate surgery group had a higher rate of physical problems such as discomfort in their voice or the cervical region. Regarding psychological aspects such as anxiety about cancer, either there was no difference between both groups, or marginally higher in the immediate surgery group. These results may be due to factors that worried patients opted for surgery.

Based on favorable results of the active surveillance conducted by Kuma Hospital and Cancer Institute Hospital of JFCR, active surveillance was acknowledged as one of the management strategies in Medical Guidelines for Clinical Practice for the Diagnosis and Management of Thyroid Nodules in 2010 on the premise that thorough explanation was given to the patient and consent was obtained. In 2015, active surveillance for low-risk papillary thyroid microcarcinoma was also adopted in American Thyroid Association's Management Guidelines for Adult Patients with Thyroid Nodules and Differentiated Thyroid Cancer. Medical Guidelines for Clinical Practice for the Diagnosis and Management of Thyroid Nodules in 2018 (published by Japan Association of Endocrine Surgeons and the Japanese Society of Thyroid Surgery), actively recommends active surveillance for low-risk papillary thyroid microcarcinoma.

Generally, the prognosis of clinical papillary thyroid cancer in patients aged 55 years or older is poorer than in younger patients. However, quite strangely, in papillary microcarcinoma, patients 40 years or younger are more likely to have tumor growth and lymph node metastases than patients aged 41 to 60 years, or 61 or older. However, as already stated above by us; the prognosis of papillary thyroid cancer is good in young patients. Thus, marginal disease progression in young patients will not lead to a serious condition. Curiously, the tumors shrank in 17% of the patient during active surveillance.

== Indication ==
Active Surveillance is indicated for low-risk thyroid microcarcinoma 10 mm or smaller in maximum diameter. However, surgery is recommended as a high-risk thyroid microcarcinoma in the following cases.

- Presence of lymph node metastasis or distant metastasis (very rare).
- Invasion into the recurrent laryngeal nerve or the trachea.
- The tumor is located along the course of the recurrent laryngeal nerve.
- The tumor is widely adherent to the trachea.
- Diagnosis of aggressive subtype of papillary thyroid carcinoma on cytology (very rare).
- The patient is a minor (There is no data on active surveillance in minors).

== Method ==
During the examination, tumor growth, appearance of any new lesions, and lymph node metastases should be checked, and if there are such findings, surgery should be recommended.
