= Nuclear groove =

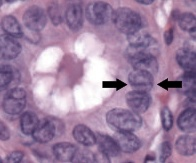
Nuclear grooves (arrows indicate one of them) in papillary thyroid cancer. H&E stain.

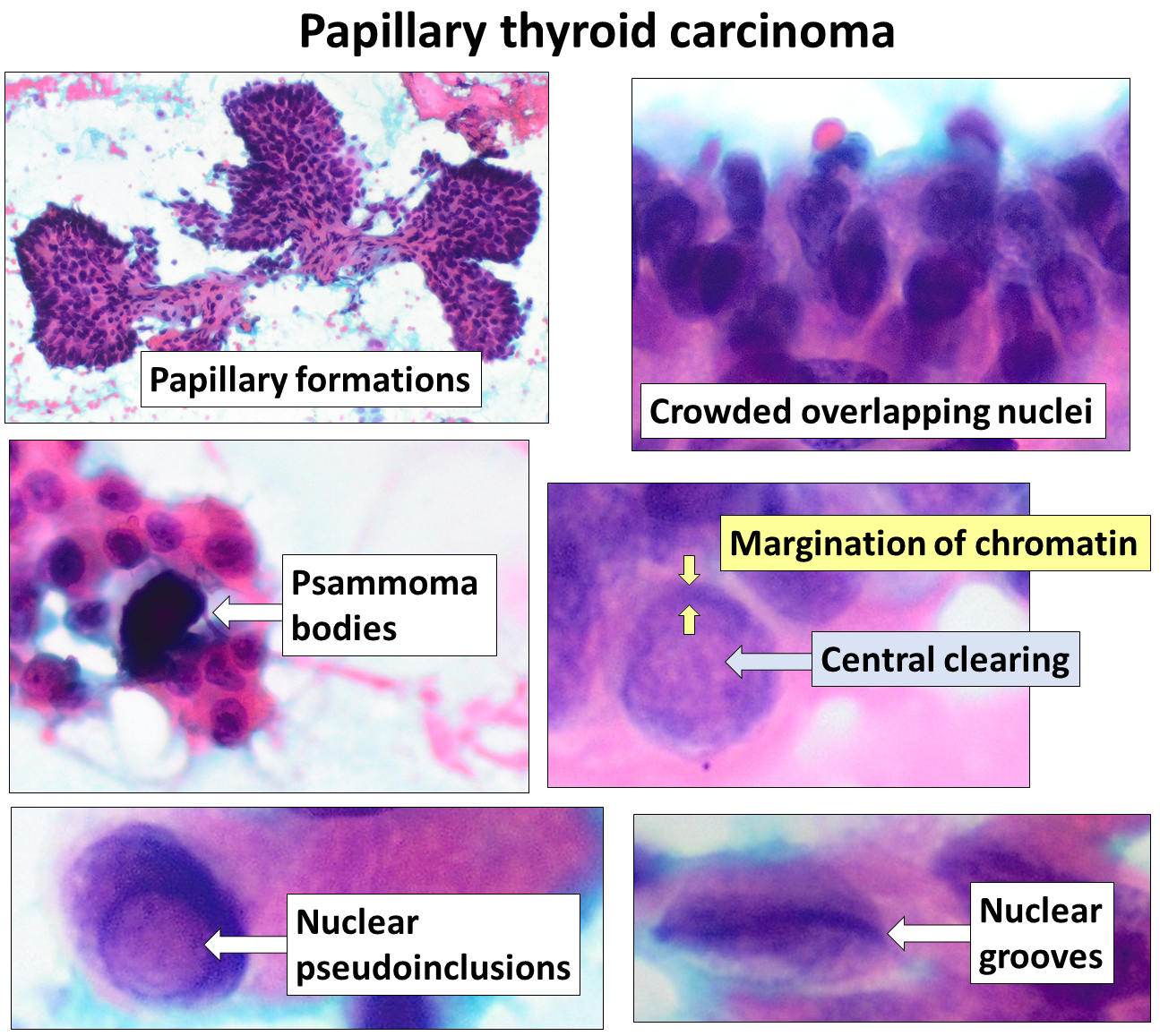
Cytopathology of papillary thyroid carcinoma, with typical features, with nuclear groove at bottom right. Pap stain.

A nuclear groove is an invagination of the nuclear envelope, in the longitudinal axis. It can be present in:

- Thyroid neoplasms: It is a characteristic feature of papillary thyroid carcinoma, but has also been seen in other types of thyroid neoplasms, as well as in non-neoplastic thyroid lesions.
- Ovarian tumors including Brenner tumors, adult granulosa cell tumors, and transitional cell tumors.
- Breast carcinomas
- Vaginal, cervical and/or endometrial neoplasms
- Papillary neoplasms of several organs: papillary transitional cell carcinoma of the urinary bladder, papillary renal cell carcinoma, papillary endometrioid carcinoma of the prostate, in thymic carcinomas, and in non-epithelial tumors.
