= Thyroid cancer =

Malignancy originating in the thyroid gland

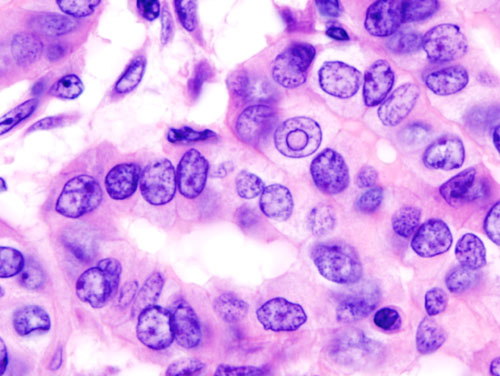
- Micrograph of a papillary thyroid carcinoma demonstrating diagnostic features (nuclear clearing and overlapping nuclei).
- Specialty: Oncology
- Symptoms: Swelling or lump in the neck
- Risk factors: Radiation exposure, enlarged thyroid, family history, obesity
- Diagnostic method: Ultrasound, fine needle aspiration
- Differential diagnosis: Thyroid nodule, metastatic disease
- Treatment: Surgery, radiation therapy, chemotherapy, thyroid hormone, targeted therapy, watchful waiting
- Prognosis: Five year survival rates 98% (US)
- Frequency: 3.2 million (2015)
- Deaths: 31,900 (2015)

Thyroid cancer is cancer that develops from the tissues of the thyroid gland. It is a disease in which cells grow abnormally and have the potential to spread to other parts of the body. Symptoms can include swelling or a lump in the neck, difficulty swallowing or voice changes including hoarseness, or a feeling of something being in the throat due to mass effect from the tumor. However, most cases are asymptomatic. Cancer can also occur in the thyroid after spread from other locations, in which case it is not classified as thyroid cancer.

Risk factors include radiation exposure at a young age, having an enlarged thyroid, family history and obesity. The four main types are papillary thyroid cancer, follicular thyroid cancer, medullary thyroid cancer, and anaplastic thyroid cancer. Diagnosis is often based on ultrasound and fine needle aspiration. Screening people without symptoms and at normal risk for the disease is not recommended.

Treatment options may include surgery, radiation therapy including radioactive iodine, chemotherapy, thyroid hormone, targeted therapy, and watchful waiting. Surgery may involve removing part or all of the thyroid. Five-year survival rates are 98% in the United States.

Globally as of 2015, 3.2 million people have thyroid cancer. In 2012, 298,000 new cases occurred. It most commonly is diagnosed between the ages of 20 and 65. Women are affected more often than men. Those of Asian descent are more commonly affected; with a higher rate of mortality among Filipino females. Rates have increased in the last few decades, which is believed to be due to better detection. In 2015, it resulted in 31,900 deaths.

== Signs and symptoms ==
Most people with thyroid cancer do not have symptoms at the time of diagnosis and thyroid nodules are usually found incidentally on imaging of the neck. Up to 65% of adults have small nodules in their thyroids, but typically under 10% of these nodules are found to be cancerous. Sometimes, the first sign is an enlarged lymph node. Later symptoms that can be present are pain in the anterior region of the neck and changes in voice due to the close proximity of the recurrent laryngeal nerve to the thyroid gland. These nodules and enlarged lymph nodes can also cause swelling in the neck and difficulty swallowing.

Thyroid cancer is usually found in a euthyroid patient, but symptoms of hyperthyroidism or hypothyroidism may be associated with a large or metastatic, well-differentiated tumor. Thyroid nodules are of particular concern when they are found in those under the age of 20. At this age, thyroid nodules are more likely to be malignant than benign.

== Causes ==
Thyroid cancers are thought to be related to a number of environmental and genetic predisposing factors, but significant uncertainty remains regarding their causes.

Environmental exposure to ionising radiation from both natural background sources and artificial sources is suspected to play a significant role, and significantly increased rates of thyroid cancer occur in those exposed to mantlefield radiation for lymphoma, and those exposed to iodine-131 following the Chernobyl, Fukushima, Kyshtym, and Windscale nuclear disasters. Thyroiditis and other thyroid diseases also predispose to thyroid cancer.

Genetic causes include multiple endocrine neoplasia type 2, which markedly increases rates, particularly of the rarer medullary form of the disease. Mutations in the genes for MenA and Men2B in multiple endocrine neoplasia is responsible for 25% of medullary thyroid cancers. Hyperthyroidism is the overfunctioning of the thyroid gland causing an excessive amount of thyroid hormones to be released. These hormones contribute to one's metabolism, growth, brain development, body temperature, and reproductive function. This condition is also linked to Graves' Disease. A symptom of hyperthyroidism is a change in size of one's thyroid, which is associated with patients who have been found to have thyroid cancer. [90] There is also hypothyroidism, when there is an underfunction of the thyroid gland, which is associated with Hashimoto's thyroidosis. Hashimoto thyroidosis has a direct connection to an increased risk of thyroid cancer, along with multiple other cancer types.[89] Family relatives who have an issue with thyroids in their life will likely pass it down to their family. But the thyroid issues may present themselves in different ways. These ways can range from hypothyroidism, hyperthyroidism, Graves' Disease, Hashinoto's thyroidosis and cancer.

The FDA requires a boxed warning in the package inserts of GLP-1 agonists due to the risk of thyroid C-cell tumors, including medullary thyroid cancer (MTC), with a warning that GLP-1 agonists are contraindicated in people with a family or personal history of MTC or multiple endocrine neoplasia type 2. In mice, long-term use of GLP-1 agonists stimulates calcitonin secretion, leading to C-cell hypertrophy and an increased risk of thyroid cancer, but no increased secretion of calcitonin has been observed in humans. A retrospective national cohort study in France found an increased risk of thyroid cancer (all and medullary) following 1-3 years of treatment with GLP-1 agonists for diabetes, but this was not observed in randomized control trials, as well as in other large retrospective studies, including one with long-term use of GLP-1 agonists and over 10-years of follow-up. A small study of patients with low-risk thyroid cancer undergoing active surveillance showed that GLP-1RA therapy did not affect tumor growth kinetics.

== Diagnosis ==
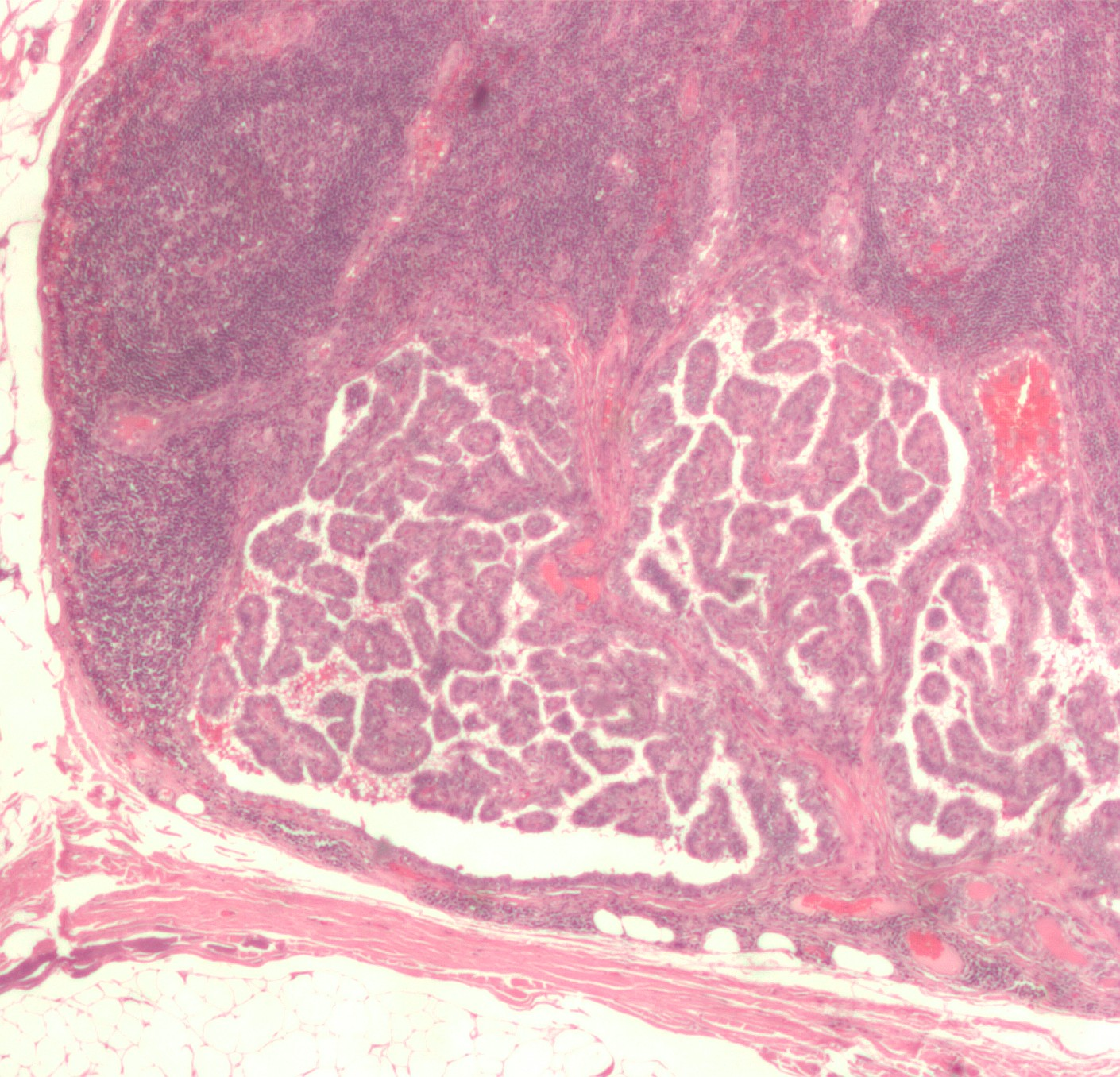
Micrograph of a lymph node with papillary thyroid carcinoma

After a thyroid nodule is found during a physical examination or incidentally on imaging, a referral to an endocrinologist or a thyroidologist may occur. Most commonly, an ultrasound is performed to confirm the presence of a nodule and assess the status of the whole gland. Various radiological clinical criteria, including the thyroid imaging reporting and data system (TI-RADs) score, are used to characterize the risk of malignancy. TI-RADS developed by the American College of Radiology (ACR) guides clinicians in deciding which nodules require fine-needle aspiration cytology (FNAC) and in planning follow-up. Various online tools have been developed to assist in applying these criteria to clinical practice. On ultrasound, nodules that are hypoechogenic (solid consistency), having irregular borders, increased vascularity, calcifications, or being taller than wide on transverse views are associated with malignancy. Biopsy or cytology are required if the ultrasound characteristics suggest malignancy. If ultrasound results are equivocal or unclear, or if the thyroid nodule is small (typically less than 1 cm), the nodule can be monitored over time with serial ultrasounds. Ultrasound has a sensitivity of 64-77% and a specificity of 82-90% for the detection of thyroid cancer. Measurement of thyroid stimulating hormone, free and/or total triiodothyronine (T3) and thyroxine (T4) levels, and antithyroid antibodies will help decide if a functional thyroid disease such as Hashimoto's thyroiditis is present, a known cause of a benign nodular goiter. A thyroid scan, performed often in conjunction with a radioactive iodine uptake test may be used to determine whether a nodule is hyperactive which may help to make a decision whether to perform a biopsy of the nodule. Measurement of calcitonin is necessary to exclude the presence of medullary thyroid cancer. To achieve a definitive diagnosis, a fine needle aspiration cytology test may be performed and reported according to the Bethesda system.

After diagnosis, to understand potential for spread of disease, or for follow up monitoring after surgery, a whole body I-131 or I-123 radioactive iodine scan may be performed.

In adults without symptoms, screening for thyroid cancer is not recommended.

=== Classification ===
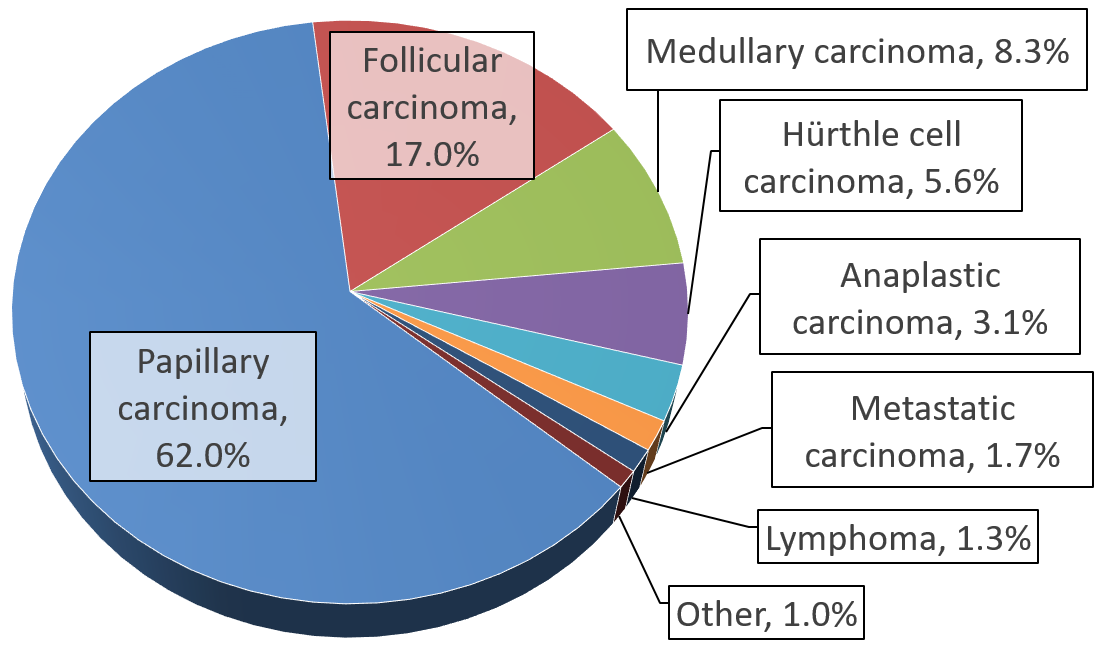
Pie chart of thyroid cancer types by incidence.

Thyroid cancers can be classified according to their histopathological characteristics. These variants can be distinguished (distribution over various subtypes may show regional variation):

- Papillary thyroid cancer (75 to 85% of cases) – is more often diagnosed in young females compared to other types of thyroid cancer and has an excellent prognosis. It may occur in women with familial adenomatous polyposis and in patients with Cowden syndrome. A follicular variant of papillary thyroid cancer also exists.
- Newly reclassified variant: noninvasive follicular thyroid neoplasm with papillary-like nuclear features is considered an indolent tumor of limited biologic potential.
- Follicular thyroid cancer (10 to 20% of cases) – occasionally seen in people with Cowden syndrome. Some include Hürthle cell carcinoma as a variant and others list it as a separate type.
- Medullary thyroid cancer (5 to 8% of cases) – cancer of the parafollicular cells, often part of multiple endocrine neoplasia type 2.
- Poorly differentiated thyroid cancer
- Anaplastic thyroid cancer (1 to 2%) despite constituting only 1% of thyroid cancers, the type is responsible for 20% of thyroid cancer deaths. It is characterized by a severe course with median survival of 6.5 months.
- Others
  - Thyroid lymphoma
  - Squamous cell thyroid carcinoma
  - Sarcoma of thyroid
  - Hürthle cell carcinoma

The follicular and papillary types together can be classified as "differentiated thyroid cancer". These types have a more favorable prognosis than the medullary and undifferentiated types.

- Papillary microcarcinoma is a subset of papillary thyroid cancer defined as a nodule measuring less than or equal to 1 cm. 43% of all thyroid cancers and 50% of new cases of papillary thyroid carcinoma are papillary microcarcinoma. Management strategies for incidental papillary microcarcinoma on ultrasound (and confirmed on FNAB) range from total thyroidectomy with radioactive iodine ablation to lobectomy or observation alone. Harach et al. suggest using the term "occult papillary tumor" to avoid giving patients distress over having cancer. Woolner et al. first arbitrarily coined the term "occult papillary carcinoma", in 1960, to describe papillary carcinomas ≤ 1.5 cm in diameter.

==== Staging ====
Cancer staging is the process of determining the extent of the development of a cancer. The TNM staging system is usually used to classify stages of cancers, but not of the brain. The TNM system is broken into three key factors. The T part stands for the size of the tumor, and has it grown into any other body part near the body. The N is for if the cancer has grown into any lymph nodes nearby. And finally, the M stands for if the cancer has metastasized, and if the cancer has spread to any major organs in the body.

After the TNM system has been determined, the number system is then used to describe the severity of the cancer. The stages range from one (I) to four (IV), typically with stage one being the lowest and least amount of cancer spread, and stage four being the highest with the most cancer spread through the body.

Thyroid cancer staging can be determined by either clinical staging which includes several different tests evaluate the extent of the cancer, or pathological staging which includes surgery.

Stage M1 thyroid cancer

Stage N1a thyroid cancer

Stage N1b thyroid cancer

Stage T1a thyroid cancer

Stage T1b thyroid cancer

Stage T2 thyroid cancer

Stage T3 thyroid cancer

Stage T4a thyroid cancer

Stage T4b thyroid cancer

=== Metastases ===
Detection of differentiated thyroid cancer metastases may be detected by performing a full-body scintigraphy using iodine-131.

Scintigraphy, also known as iodine-131 scan, is a noninvasive imaging test that uses small amounts of radioactive material to check how the thyroid is working. The thyroid cells (both normal and cancerous) easily absorb the iodine and when shown through imaging the scintigraphy scan will detect the radiation emitted by the iodine-131, so if the cancer has spread/metastasized to other parts of the body, they may also absorb the iodine which will show up as hot spots on the scan.

Most patients with thyroid cancer usually have it contained within the thyroid when they are diagnosed. Usually 30% will have metastatic cancer, with the cancer usually being spread to the lymph nodes in the neck. Most patients with thyroid cancer have good chances of survival, but that changes if the cancer is spread outside of the neck at the time of the diagnosis. While death is rare in cases of thyroid cancer, it significantly increases when the cancer has spread to outside of the neck such as the lungs and bones. Only about 1-4% of the patients have a chance of this kind of metastatic cancer.

=== Spread ===
Thyroid cancer can spread directly, via lymphatics or blood. Direct spread occurs through infiltration of the surrounding tissues. The tumor infiltrates into infrahyoid muscles, trachea, oesophagus, recurrent laryngeal nerve, carotid sheath, etc. The tumor then becomes fixed. Anaplastic carcinoma spreads mostly by direct spread, while papillary carcinoma spreads so the least. Lymphatic spread is most common in papillary carcinoma. Cervical lymph nodes become palpable in papillary carcinoma even when the primary tumor is unpalpable. Deep cervical nodes, pretracheal, prelaryngeal, and paratracheal groups of lymph nodes are often affected. The lymph node affected is usually the same side as that of the location of the tumor. Blood spread is also possible in thyroid cancers, especially in follicular and anaplastic carcinoma. The tumor emboli do angioinvasion of lungs; end of long bones, skull, and vertebrae are affected. Pulsating metastases occur because of their increased vascularity.

== Treatment ==
Thyroidectomy and dissection of central neck compartment is the initial step in treatment of thyroid cancer in the majority of cases. Thyroid-preserving operations may be applied in cases, when thyroid cancer exhibits low biological aggressiveness (e.g. well-differentiated cancer, no evidence of lymph-node metastases, low MIB-1 index, no major genetic alterations like BRAF mutations, RET/PTC rearrangements, p53 mutations etc.) in patients younger than 45 years. If the diagnosis of well-differentiated thyroid cancer (e.g. papillary thyroid cancer) is established or suspected by FNA, then surgery is indicated. Surgical resection is the preferred treatment for all biopsy confirmed thyroid cancers. In those with very low risk tumors (such as small papillary tumors without evidence of local or metastatic spread or concerning cytologic findings), patients at high surgical risk due to medical problems, those with short expected lifespans or patients with serious medical issues precluding surgery, an active surveillance approach, in which the tumor is monitored over time (such as with serial imaging) may be pursued.

Post surgical monitoring for recurrence or metastasis may include routine ultrasound, CT scans, FDG-PET/CT, radioactive iodine whole body scans, and routine laboratory blood tests for changes in thyroglobulin, thyroglobulin antibodies, or calcitonin, depending on the subtype of thyroid cancer.

Radioactive iodine-131 is used in people with papillary or follicular thyroid cancer for ablation of residual thyroid tissue after surgery and for the treatment of thyroid cancer. Post-surgical radioactive iodine is recommended for those with high risk of cancer recurrence. Post-surgery radioactive iodine does not reduce recurrence in those with low risk thyroid cancer. Patients with medullary, anaplastic, and most Hurthle-cell cancers do not benefit from this therapy. External irradiation may be used when the cancer is unresectable, when it recurs after resection, or to relieve pain from bone metastasis.

Sorafenib and lenvatinib are approved for advanced metastatic thyroid cancer. Numerous agents are in phase II and III clinical trials.

== Prognosis ==
The prognosis of thyroid cancer is related to the type of cancer and the stage at the time of diagnosis. For the most common form of thyroid cancer, papillary, the overall prognosis is excellent with 97%, 95%, and 90% 10, 15 and 20 year overall survival respectively. The 5 year survival of all thyroid cancers, with treatment, is 98%.

Many small thyroid cancers (mostly papillary type) rarely grow or metastasize. Some have stated that thyroid cancers are overdiagnosed and will rarely cause symptoms, illness, or death, even without treatment. Low grade thyroid cancer is very commonly seen during autopsy studies, with the person dying from other causes. Increasingly, small thyroid nodules are discovered as incidental findings on imaging (CT scan, MRI, ultrasound) performed for another purpose. Few of these people with incidentally discovered, subclinical thyroid cancers will ever have any symptoms, and overtreatment may be present.

Thyroid cancer is three times more common in women than in men. The overall relative 5-year survival rate for thyroid cancer is 85% for females and 74% for males.

The identification of some molecular or DNA abnormalities has led to the development of therapies that target these molecular defects. The first of these agents to negotiate the approval process is vandetanib, a tyrosine kinase inhibitor that targets the RET proto-oncogene, two subtypes of the vascular endothelial growth factor receptor, and the epidermal growth factor receptor. For differentiated thyroid carcinoma, strategies are evolving to use selected types of targeted therapy to increase radioactive iodine uptake in papillary thyroid carcinomas that have lost the ability to concentrate iodide. This strategy would make possible the use of radioactive iodine therapy to treat "resistant" thyroid cancers.

Mitogen-activated protein kinase (MAPK) variants are the most common genetic variants seen in thyroid cancer. The BRAF 600E genetic variant is seen in 60% of papillary thyroid cancers. It is associated with increased risks of cervical lymph node metastasis, blunted response to radioactive iodine, and increased rates of local recurrence. RasGTPase mutations are seen in 13% of papillary and 25-50% of follicular cancers and are associated with increased risk of vascular invasion and higher response to radioactive iodine.

Prognosis is better in younger people than older ones.

Prognosis depends mainly on the type of cancer and cancer stage.

Thyroid cancer type	5-year survival					10-year survival
Thyroid cancer type	Stage I	Stage II	Stage III	Stage IV	Overall	Overall
Papillary	100%	100%	93%	51%	96% or 97%	93%
Follicular	100%	100%	71%	50%	91%	85%
Medullary	100%	98%	81%	28%	80%, 83% or 86%	75%
Anaplastic	(always stage IV)			7%	7% or 14%	(no data)

== Epidemiology ==
Thyroid cancer, in 2010, resulted in 36,000 deaths globally up from 24,000 in 1990. Obesity may be associated with a higher incidence of thyroid cancer, but this relationship remains the subject of much debate.

Thyroid cancer accounts for less than 1% of cancer cases and deaths in the UK. Around 2,700 people were diagnosed with thyroid cancer in the UK in 2011, and around 370 people died from the disease in 2012.

However, in South Korea, thyroid cancer was the 5th most prevalent cancer, which accounted for 7.7% of new cancer cases in 2020. This is most likely due to the increased use of ultrasounds in South Korea to look for thyroid cancer, even in asymptomatic patients.

The incidence of thyroid cancer in the United States increased by 313% from a 1974-1977 incidence of 4.6 cases per 100,000 people to 14.4 cases per 100,000 people in 2010-13. This increase is thought to be due to more widespread use of head and neck imaging (which may incidentally detect thyroid masses) as well as increased use of fine needle aspiration biopsies.

Thyroid cancer tends to be seen more in females, possibly due to higher levels of estrogen. High levels of radiation in the neck can also increase the chance of getting thyroid cancer. Additionally, certain heritable genes can cause a higher likelihood.

== Notable cases ==
- Callum Ainley, English footballer
- Ann-Katrin Berger, German footballer
- Pam Bondi, Former United States Attorney General
- Emre Can, German footballer
- Jerry Dipoto, former Major League Baseball pitcher
- Roger Ebert, American film critic
- Jennifer Grey, American actor
- Uhm Jung-hwa, South Korean singer, actor and dancer
- Lee Moon-sae, South Korean ballad singer
- Joe Piscopo, American actor
- William Rehnquist, Chief Justice of the United States (1986–2005) died September 3, 2005, from anaplastic thyroid cancer
- Katee Sackhoff, American actor
- Karen Smyers, American swimmer
- Daniel Snyder, American owner of the Washington Football Team
- Rod Stewart, British singer
- Scott Thompson, American businessman
- Sofía Vergara, American actor
- Julia Volkova, Russian singer
- April Winchell, American actor
