= Anaplastic thyroid cancer =

Most aggressive form of thyroid cancer

- Other names: Anaplastic thyroid carcinoma, ATC
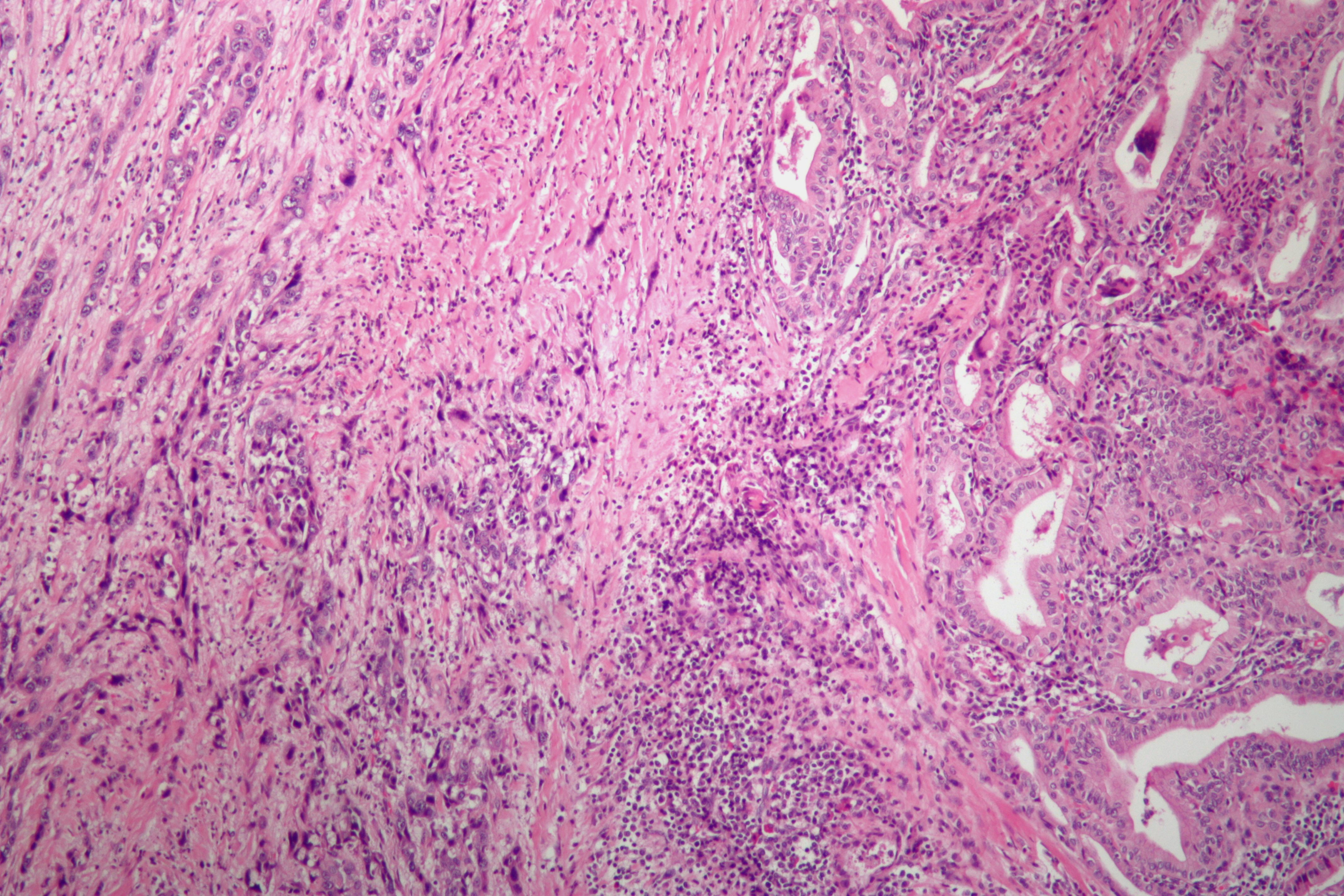
- Microscopic image of anaplastic thyroid carcinoma. H&E stain.
- Specialty: ENT surgery, oncology, endocrinology
- Prevention: Use a thyroid guard when having any type of radiation, like X-rays or certain scans - even dental X-rays.
- Treatment: Chemotherapy, radiation therapy

Anaplastic thyroid cancer (ATC), also known as anaplastic thyroid carcinoma, is an aggressive form of thyroid cancer characterized by uncontrolled growth of cells in the thyroid gland. This form of cancer generally carries a very poor prognosis due to its aggressive behavior and resistance to cancer treatments. The cells of anaplastic thyroid cancer are highly abnormal and usually no longer resemble the original thyroid cells and have poor differentiation.

ATC is an uncommon form of thyroid cancer only accounting for 1-2% of cases, but due to its high mortality, is responsible for 20-50% of deaths from thyroid cancer. The median survival time after diagnosis is three to six months. Some studies report that 10% to 15% survive more than 1 year; 3-year and 5-year survival is very rare. It occurs more commonly in women than in men and is seen most commonly in people ages 40 to 70.

== Signs and symptoms ==
Anaplastic thyroid cancer typically manifests as a rapidly enlarging neck mass. Associated redness and swelling of the overlying skin sometimes occur. ATC commonly causes symptoms by compressing local structures, such as the esophagus, carotid arteries, recurrent laryngeal nerve and trachea. This compression of local anatomic structures may cause symptoms such as difficulty controlling the voice, hoarseness, difficulty swallowing, or trouble breathing. Other symptoms include cough, neck pain, or symptoms from the spread of cancer to distant sites in the body, such as the brain. ATC may rarely present with coughing up blood.

== Causes ==
Risk factors include being over the age of sixty, a long-standing goiter, and repeated radiation exposure to the chest or neck.

== Pathogenesis ==
Nearly half of ATC cases occur in the setting of coexisting differentiated thyroid cancer. This suggests that many ATC cases have dedifferentiated from differentiated thyroid cancer and, as a result, become more aggressive and difficult to treat. Differentiated thyroid cancer is seen coexisting with ATC on fine-needle aspiration biopsies in 20-50% of cases.

Anaplastic tumors have a high mitotic rate and frequently invades the local blood and lymphatic vessels. Cellular death is frequently visualized on microscopic images. The presence of regionally swollen lymph nodes in older patients in whom needle aspiration biopsy reveals characteristic vesicular appearance of the nuclei supports a diagnosis of anaplastic carcinoma. Microscopic images of ATC usually show inflammatory cells from the immune system such as T cells and macrophages.

On immunohistochemistry testing, ATC is usually positive for the keratin, p53, and PAX8 proteins and is negative for thyroid transcription factor-1, thyroglobulin, and calcitonin. ATC cells demonstrate high levels of PD-L1 expression. BRAF and TERT mutations are seen more commonly in ATC than in differentiated thyroid cancer.

== Diagnosis ==
Fine-needle aspiration is essential in order to obtain a sample of the thyroid tissue to allow for microscopic examination. This allows an experienced pathologist to differentiate ATC from other diseases, such as other forms of thyroid cancer. It is very important to distinguish between ATC and poorly-differentiated thyroid cancer and this distinction can be difficult to make. The presence of PAX-8 positive staining and association with a different thyroid cancer that is adjacent to the ATC support the diagnosis.

ATC is divided into several different subclasses based on its microscopic characteristics. These include sarcomatoid, squamoid, osteoclastic, paucicellular, rhabdoid, and carcinomasarcoid variants. As of 2019, despite the fact that these ATC subtypes are recognized, this classification has not led to differences in management. ATC is always considered to be stage IV when it is diagnosed.

There are no reliable laboratory tests for ATC. Ultrasound imaging of ATC lesions reveals a hypoechoic mass (appears dark on ultrasound) with invasion of the local structures and may help to better characterize the presence or absence of neck lymph node metastases. If surgery is planned, however, then a contrast-enhanced computed tomography (CT) scan of the neck must be performed. A PET scan is preferred for staging ATC but a CT scan of the neck, chest, abdomen, and pelvis can be substituted if the former is unavailable. Magnetic resonance imaging (MRI) of the brain is also recommended to assess for distant metastases.

=== Differential diagnosis ===
In addition to ATC, a rapidly enlarging neck mass prompts consideration of several other important diagnoses. These include other cancers such as primary thyroid lymphoma, poorly differentiated thyroid cancer, sarcomas, and metastases from cancers of the upper digestive tract and respiratory tract. Squamous cell carcinoma of the thyroid gland is a rare cause of this presentation.

== Management ==
Anaplastic thyroid cancer seen on an ultrasound image

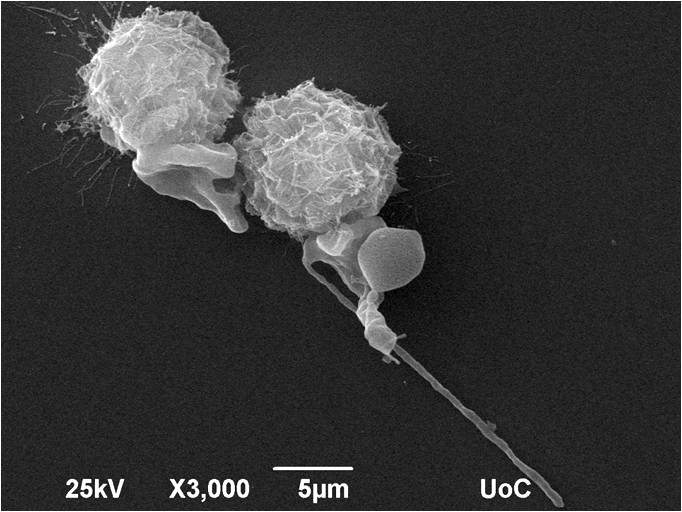
Anaplastic thyroid carcinoma cells

ATC is considered an emergency cancer diagnosis since it poses a high risk of blocking the airway and/or esophagus due to its rapid growth in the neck, either of which can quickly cause a person's death by asphyxiation, if not immediately corrected.

Unlike its differentiated counterparts, anaplastic thyroid cancer is highly unlikely to be curable either by surgery or by any other treatment modality, and is in fact usually unresectable due to its high propensity for invading surrounding tissues. A multidisciplinary team including an endocrine pathologist, head and neck surgeon, medical oncologist, radiation oncologist, endocrinologist, and a palliative care physician is essential for optimal management. Palliative treatment consists of radiation therapy usually combined with chemotherapy.

The use of tracheostomy as part of supportive care for ATC is controversial.

Medications, such as fosbretabulin (a type of combretastatin), bortezomib and TNF-Related Apoptosis Induced Ligand (TRAIL), are, however, under investigation in vitro and in human clinical studies. Based on encouraging Phase I and II clinical trial results with fosbretabulin, a type of medication that selectively destroys tumor blood vessels, clinical trials have been evaluating whether the medication can extend the survival of patients with ATC.

With the advent of molecular testing and next-generation sequencing, BRAF and MEK inhibitors are playing an increasing role in the management of patients with anaplastic thyroid cancer harboring such mutations. The combination of dabrafenib and trametinib has shown significant increases in overall survival and has been approved by the FDA. Another similar combination is vemurafenib and cobimetinib.

Immunotherapy is also starting to play an important role in anaplastic thyroid cancer management with several ongoing clinical trials demonstrating promising effects. Specific drugs being tested are atezolizumab, pembrolizumab, and spartalizumab, amongst others.

Combinatorial therapy that is molecular-based may lead to significant tumor regression, potentially making patients amenable to curative surgery.

=== Post-operative radiotherapy ===
The role of external beam radiotherapy (EBRT) in thyroid cancer remains controversial and there is no level I evidence to recommend its use in the setting of differentiated thyroid cancers such as papillary and follicular carcinomas. Anaplastic thyroid carcinomas, however, are histologically distinct from differentiated thyroid cancers and due to the highly aggressive nature of ATC aggressive postoperative radiation and chemotherapy are typically recommended.

The National Comprehensive Cancer Network Clinical Practice Guidelines currently recommend that postoperative radiation and chemotherapy be strongly considered. No published randomized controlled trials have examined the addition of EBRT to standard treatment, namely surgery. Radioactive iodine is typically ineffective in the management of ATC as it is not an iodine-avid cancer.

Imbalances in age, sex, completeness of surgical excision, histological type and stage, between patients receiving and not receiving EBRT, confound retrospective studies. Variability also exists between treatment and non-treatment groups in the use of radio-iodine and post-treatment thyroid stimulating hormone (TSH) suppression and treatment techniques between and within retrospective studies.

Some recent studies have indicated that EBRT may be promising, though the number of patients studies has been small.

Clinical trials for investigational treatments are often considered by healthcare professionals and patients as first-line treatment.

=== Add-on therapy ===
In the absence of extracervical or unresectable disease, surgical excision should be followed by adjuvant radiotherapy. In the 18–24% of patients whose tumour seems both confined to the neck and grossly resectable, complete surgical resection followed by adjuvant radiotherapy and chemotherapy could yield a 75–80% survival at 2 years.

There are a number of clinical trials for anaplastic thyroid carcinoma underway or being planned.

== Prognosis ==
The overall 5-year survival rate of anaplastic thyroid cancer has been given as 7% or 14%, although the latter has been criticized as being overestimated. Additional factors that affect prognosis include the person's age, the presence of distant metastases, the dose of radiation administered to the primary tumor and regional lymph nodes, and if combined modality treatment is used.

Treatment of anaplastic thyroid cancer is generally palliative in its intent due to its highly aggressive nature and nearly universal mortality. Larger tumors, distant metastases, acute obstructive symptoms, and leukocytosis portend a poorer prognosis. Death is attributable to upper airway obstruction and suffocation in half of patients, and to a combination of complications of local and distant disease, or therapy, or both in the remainder.

Anaplastic thyroid cancer is extremely aggressive; historically, in most cases death occurs in less than 1 year as a result of aggressive local growth and compromise of vital structures in the neck. ATC in most series has a median survival of 4 to 5 months from the time of diagnosis, with rare long-term survivors.

Recent data however suggests that patients with BRAFV600E mutated disease, even if in an advanced stage, may have significantly better prognosis, as novel targeted therapies can extend tumor control considerably, while also leading to tumor burden decrease and potentially make patients candidates for surgery. Recent advances show that using a combination of novel targeted therapies, immunotherapy, and surgery, 1 year and 2 year survival for anaplastic thyroid cancer patients have increased to 59% and 42%, respectively.

== Notable cases ==
- William Rehnquist (1924–2005), Chief Justice of the United States (1986–2005)
- John Holt (1959–2013), NFL, Tampa Bay Buccaneers, Indianapolis Colts
- Kevin Towers (1961–2018), MLB executive
- Guillermo Anderson (1962–2016), Honduran composer and singer
- Jeff Foskett (1956–2023), Member of Beach Boys
- Joe Plater. YouTube Vlogger.
- Adam Somner (1967–2024), Director and producer
