= KUMA hospital =

Hospital in Kobe, Japan

Kuma Hospital (Japanese: 隈病院, Kuma Byōin)is a private specialized hospital in Kobe, Hyōgo Prefecture, Japan. It is internationally recognized as a center of excellence for the diagnosis and treatment of thyroid and parathyroid diseases.

== Medical Contribution ==
The hospital is a pioneer in the conservative management of low-risk papillary thyroid cancer. Under the leadership of Dr. Akira Miyauchi, Kuma Hospital introduced "active surveillance" in the 1990s, a strategy that avoids immediate surgery for stable microcarcinomas. This approach has since been adopted by international clinical guidelines, including those of the American Thyroid Association.

== History ==
Kuma Hospital was established in 1932 by Dr. Shizuo Kuma in Kobe as a general surgery clinic. In 1966, under the leadership of Dr. Kanzi Kuma, the hospital transitioned into a specialized institution focused on thyroid care. In 2001, Dr. Akira Miyauchi—who later served as President of the International Association of Endocrine Surgeons (2022–2024)—was appointed as the third President and COO. In 2010, Natsuki Kuma became the third CEO, and in 2022, Dr. Takashi Akamizu, former Professor of the First Department of Internal Medicine at Wakayama Medical University, was appointed as the fourth President.

== Departments ==
- Endocrinology
- Endocrine Surgery
- Breast surgery
