= THADA =

Protein-coding gene in the species Homo sapiens

Identifiers
- Aliases: THADA, GITA, ARMC13, armadillo repeat containing, THADA armadillo repeat containing, Trm732
- External IDs: OMIM: 611800; MGI: 3039623; GeneCards: THADA

Gene location (Human)
Chr.	Chromosome 2 (human)
Band	2p21	Start	43,230,851 bp
Band	2p21	End	43,596,038 bp

Gene location (Mouse)
Chr.	Chromosome 17 (mouse)
Band	17|17 E4	Start	84,497,504 bp
Band	17|17 E4	End	84,773,633 bp
RNA expression pattern
Bgee	Human / Mouse (ortholog); Top expressed in: Achilles tendon; right uterine tube; right lobe of thyroid gland; left lobe of thyroid gland; tendon of biceps brachii; sural nerve; skin of leg; anterior pituitary; skin of abdomen; right lobe of liver / Top expressed in: zygote; secondary oocyte; genital tubercle; tail of embryo; otic vesicle; otolith organ; utricle; spermatid; primary oocyte; spermatocyte; More reference expression data
BioGPS	n/a
Gene ontology
Molecular function	protein binding
Cellular component	cytoplasmic side of endoplasmic reticulum membrane; cytosol
Biological process	negative regulation of endoplasmic reticulum calcium ion concentration; lipid homeostasis; negative regulation of ATPase-coupled calcium transmembrane transporter activity; adaptive thermogenesis; tRNA methylation
Sources:Amigo / QuickGO
Orthologs
Databases	NCBI: entry; OMA: entry
Species	Human	Mouse
Entrez	63892	240174
Ensembl	ENSG00000115970	ENSMUSG00000024251
UniProt	Q6YHU6	A8C756
RefSeq (mRNA)	NM_001083953; NM_001271643; NM_001271644; NM_022065; NM_001345923 NM_001345924; NM_001345925	NM_177826; NM_183021
RefSeq (protein)	NP_001077422; NP_001258572; NP_001258573; NP_001332852; NP_001332853 NP_001332854; NP_071348	NP_898842
Location (UCSC)	Chr 2: 43.23 – 43.6 Mb	Chr 17: 84.5 – 84.77 Mb
PubMed search
- Wikidata
View/Edit Human	View/Edit Mouse

Thyroid adenoma associated is a protein in humans that is encoded by the THADA gene.
