= Noninvasive follicular thyroid neoplasm with papillary-like nuclear features =

Indolent thyroid tumor

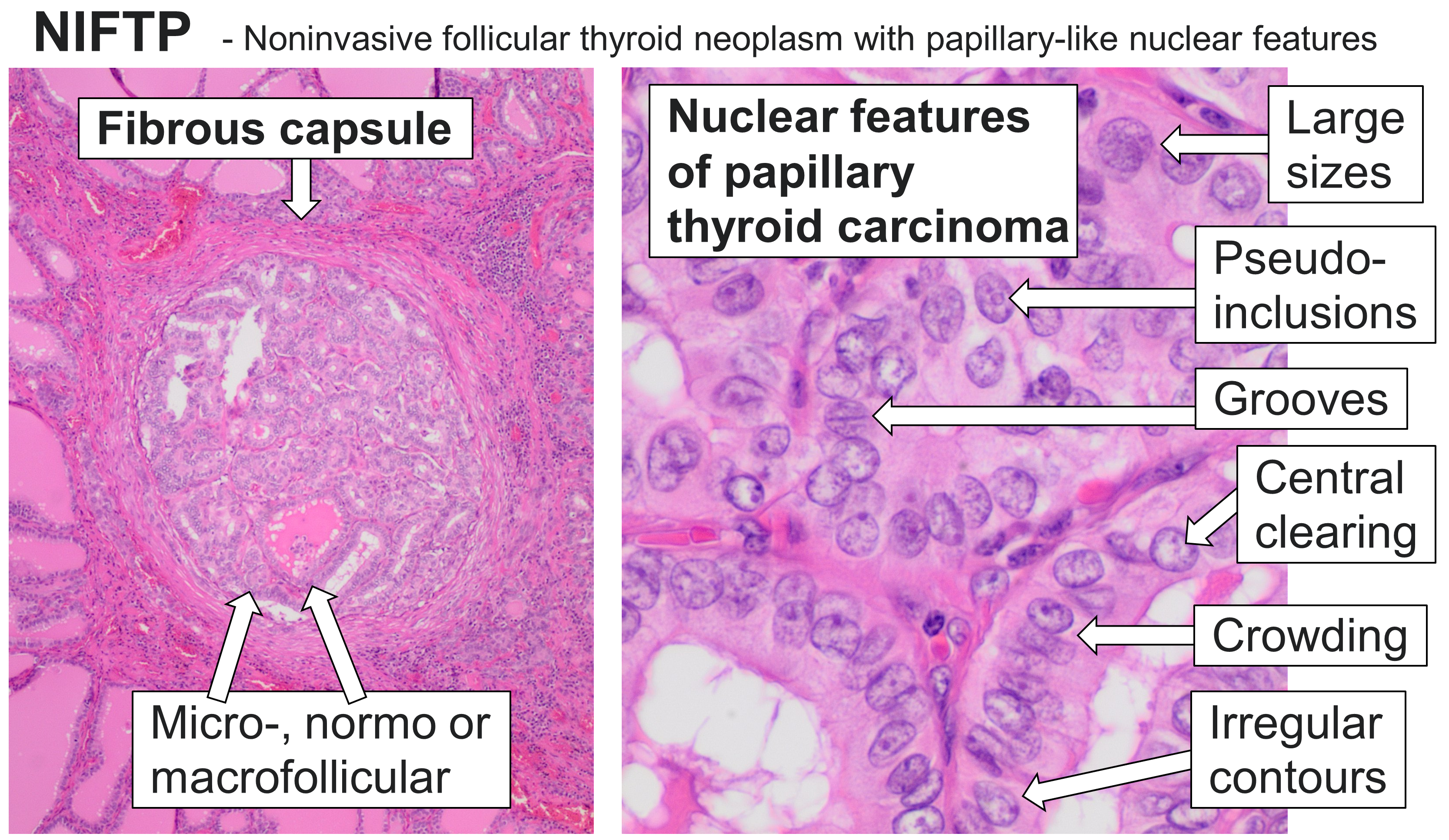
Histopathology of NIFTP, H&E stain.

Noninvasive follicular thyroid neoplasm with papillary-like nuclear features (NIFTP) is an indolent thyroid tumor that was previously classified as an encapsulated follicular variant of papillary thyroid carcinoma, necessitating a new classification as it was recognized that encapsulated tumors without invasion have an indolent behavior, and may be over-treated if classified as a type of cancer.

== Signs and symptoms ==
The clinical presentation of the patients is identical to other thyroid tumors, where there is usually a painless, asymptomatic, mobile thyroid gland nodule or enlargement. Depending on the size, additional symptoms of hoarseness, difficulty swallowing, or other compression symptoms may be experienced. In nearly all cases, the patients do not have any thyroid hormone dysfunction (hyperthyroidism or hypothyroidism – respectively, excessive or low hormone levels).

== Genetics ==
This tumor shows a very high association with other follicular-pattern tumors, with RAS mutations the most commonly identified. However, PPARγ and THADA gene fusions, and BRAF K601E mutations may be seen on occasion. BRAF V600E mutations and RET gene fusions that are commonly seen in classical type papillary carcinoma are not seen in this tumor.

== Diagnosis ==
=== Classification ===
Definition of noninvasive follicular thyroid neoplasm with papillary-like nuclear features (NIFTP): A noninvasive neoplasm that arises from the thyroid follicular cells (cells that normally make thyroid hormone), showing a predominantly follicular growth pattern and with nuclear features of papillary thyroid carcinoma. There are several specific inclusion and exclusion criteria (see below). When these are met, this tumor has an extremely low malignant potential.

Abbreviations:

NIFTP: Noninvasive follicular thyroid neoplasm with papillary-like nuclear features

EFVPTC: Encapsulated follicular variant of papillary thyroid carcinoma.

PTC: Papillary thyroid carcinoma.

The new classification will be included in the World Health Organization's new Classification of Endocrine Organ Tumours, due out in 2017.

=== Imaging findings ===
Clinical evaluation is usually done with ultrasound studies, which will usually show a solid, well demarcated mass, often showing limited shadowing (hypoechoic). Depending on the specific character on ultrasound and other clinical findings, a fine needle aspiration is often performed.

=== Fine needle aspiration ===
This involves extracting a fluid sample through a thin needle inserted into the nodule (mass), and creating slides that are then interpreted by a cytopathologist. These tumors are difficult to interpret. As a result, it is likely that over 90% of these tumors will be put into one of the indeterminate categories of The Bethesda System for Reporting Thyroid Cytopathology: Recommended Diagnostic Categories The indeterminate categories of Bethesda include:

- Benign
- Atypia of Undetermined Significance or Follicular Lesion of Undetermined Significance (Bethesda Category III);
- Follicular Neoplasm or Suspicious for a Follicular Neoplasm (Bethesda Category IV);
- Suspicious for Malignancy (Bethesda category V).
- Malignant (Bethesda category VI)

A NIFTP diagnosis cannot be made on the basis fine needle aspiration alone. Evaluation of a surgical resection specimen is required to rule out invasive growth. If molecular studies are applied to the fine needle aspiration material, an RAS mutation is the most common identification.

=== Pathology findings ===
==== Size ====
Tumors can be quite variable in size, ranging from as small as 0.7 centimetres (0.28 in) up to 10 centimetres (3.9 in), although in general the tumors are about 2–4 centimetres (0.79–1.57 in). The critical size threshold used to be 1 centimetre (0.39 in), but supporting studies have lowered that threshold. Most tumors are seen in just one lobe of the thyroid gland (unifocal), but multicentric tumors (same lobe or opposite lobe) can be seen in up to 38% of cases.

==== Histologic features ====
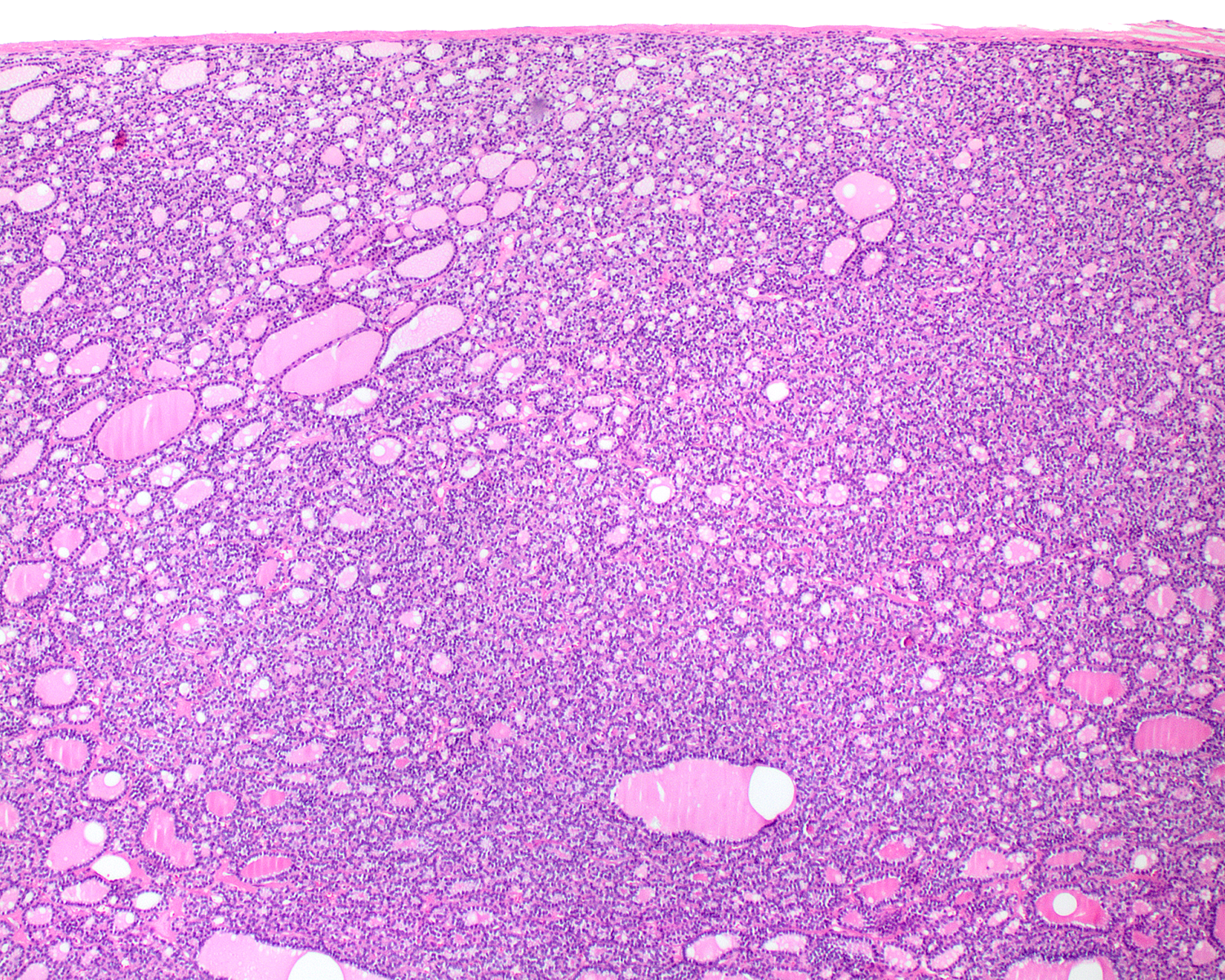
Thyroid NIFTP tumor capsule

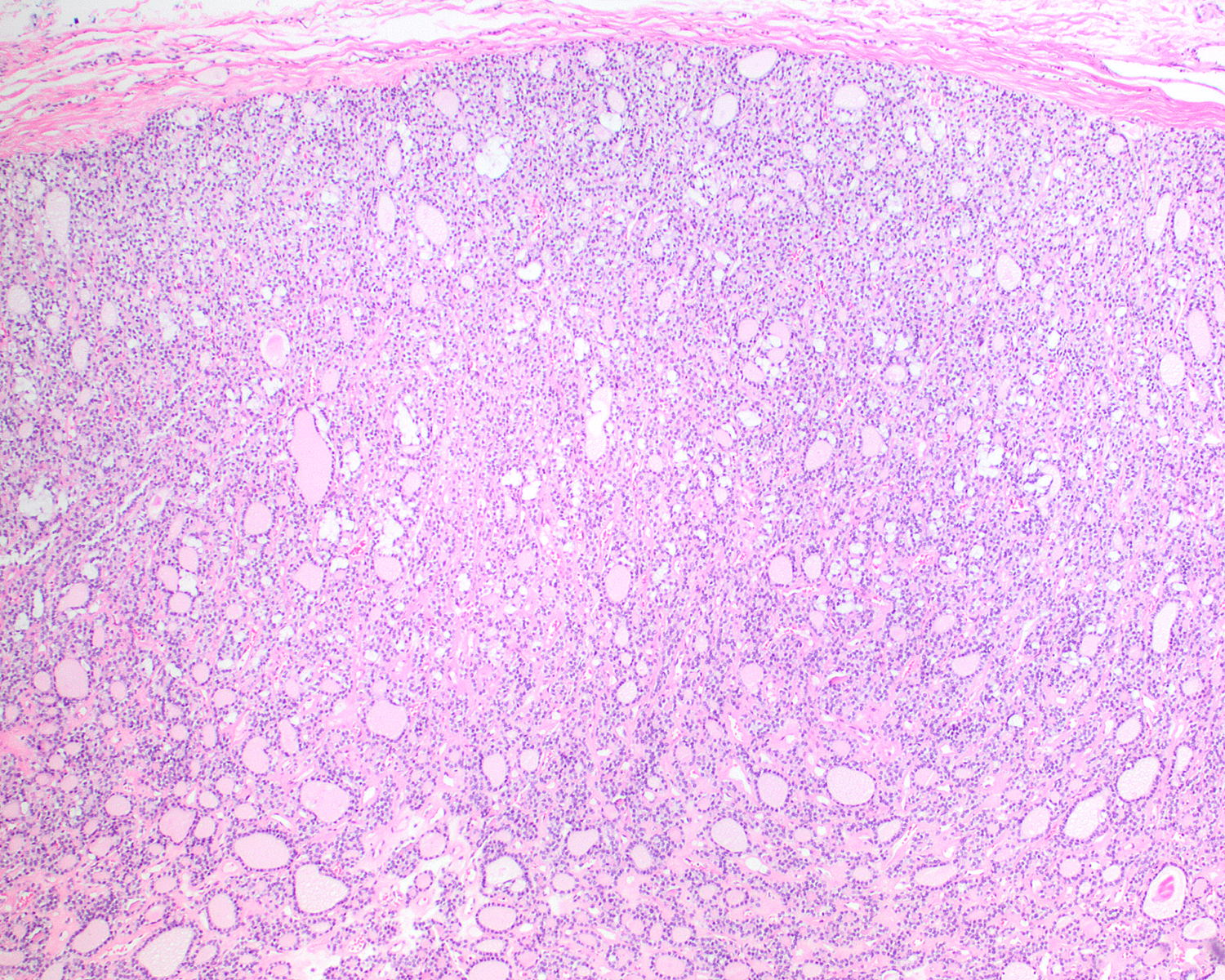
There is no evidence of invasion of this well formed fibrous connective tissue capsule, helping to support a diagnosis of NIFTP.

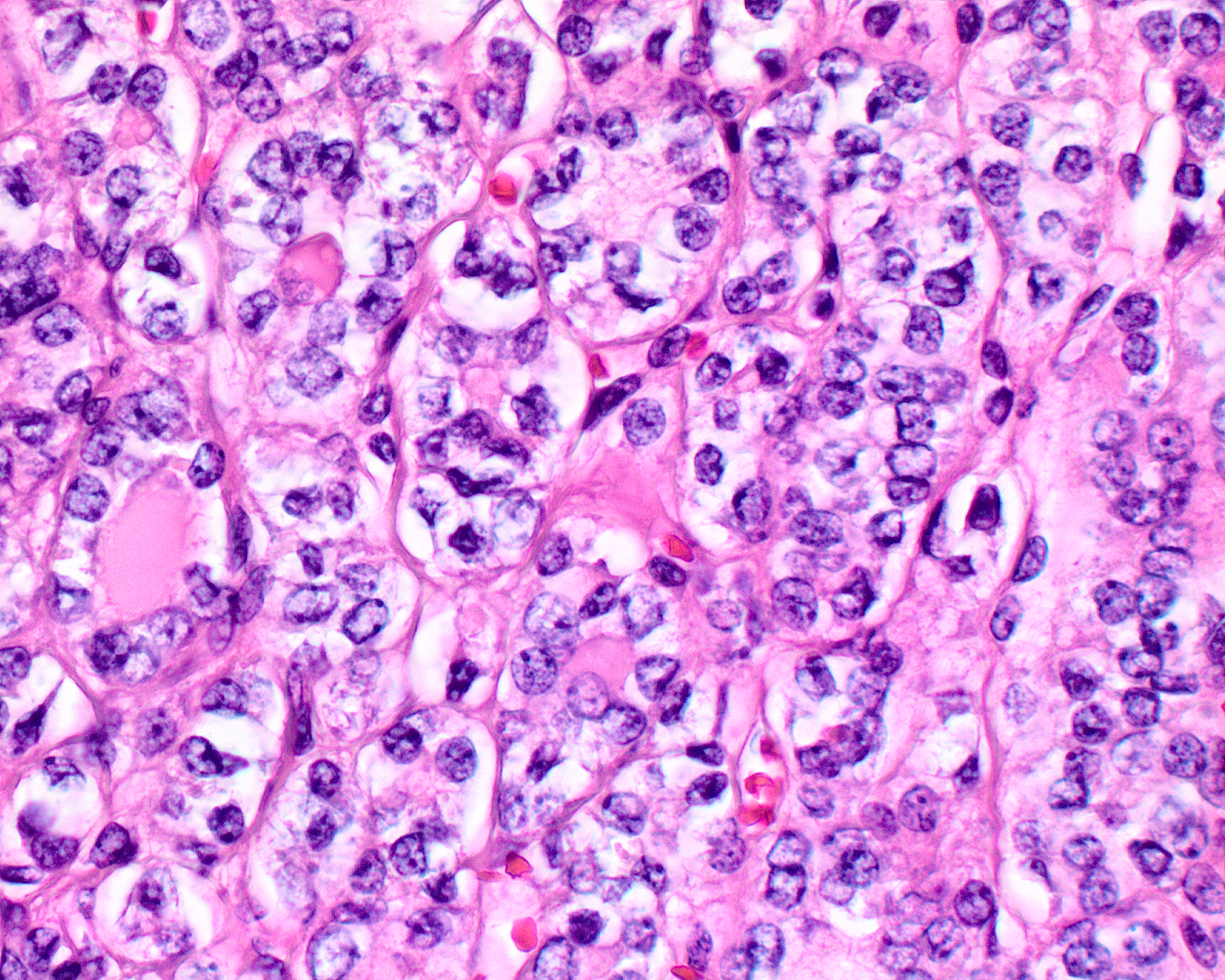
NIFTP tumor shows specific nuclear features of papillary thyroid carcinoma.

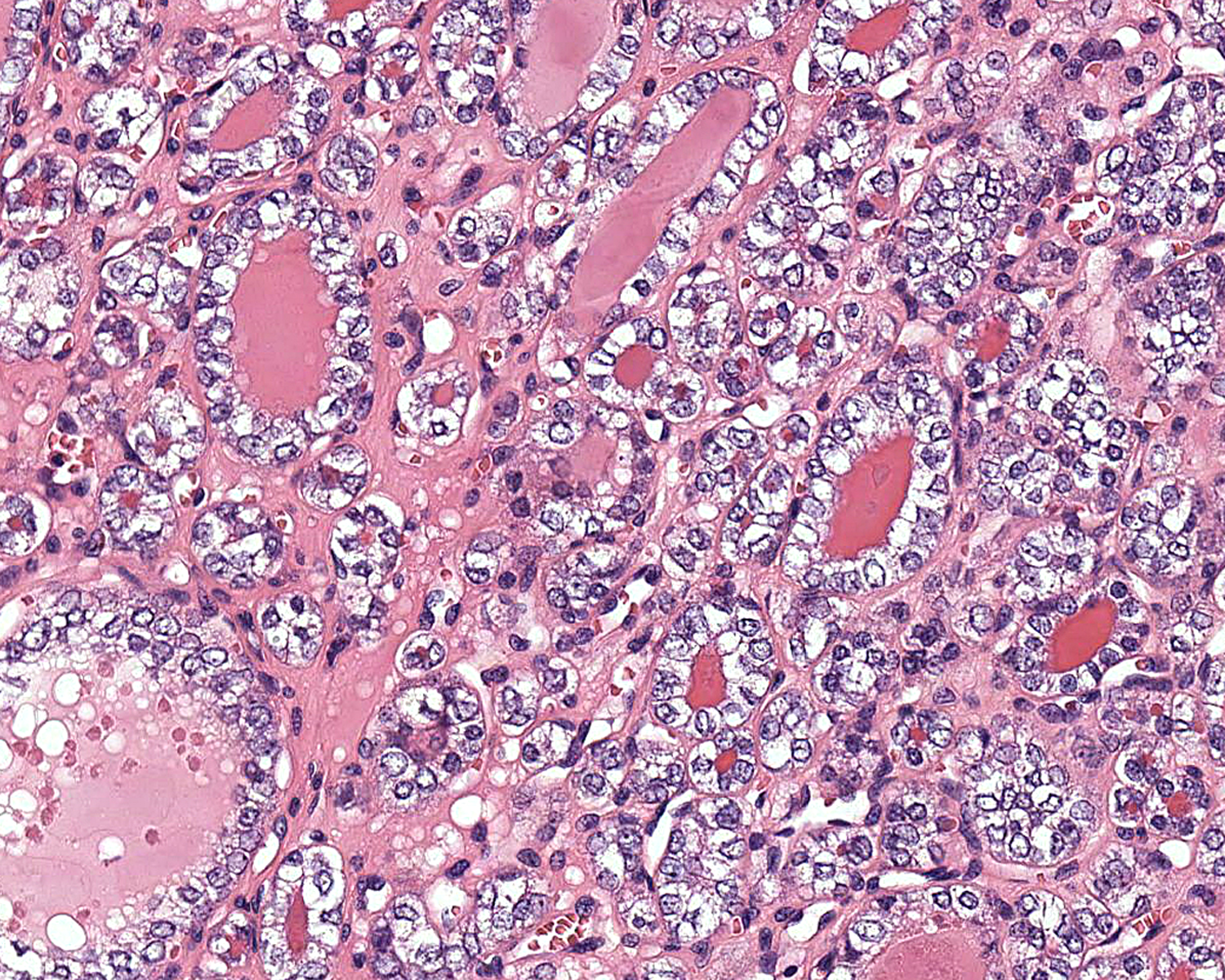
The nuclear features of papillary thyroid carcinoma, but within an encapsulated neoplasm: NIFTP

Several specific features must be identified for the tumor to be classified in this new category, while exclusion criteria should also be evaluated.

1) Encapsulated or partially encapsulated. The tumors are usually very well delimited or circumscribed, with the majority encapsulated, surrounded by a well formed fibrous connective tissue capsule.

2) Complete absence of invasion of any kind in a tumor that has been thoroughly and carefully evaluated with the whole capsule of the lesion sampled.

3) Predominantly follicular pattern of growth. Papillary structures should not be present. Further, solid, insular, or trabecular architecture must be <30% of the overall tumor for this category to still apply. Colloid (the material that thyroid follicular cells create) is easily identified throughout.

4) Must have the characteristic nuclear features of papillary thyroid carcinoma, although sometimes the features are patchy in distribution without all of the tumor showing those features. The nuclear features can be divided into three main categories:

- Nuclear size and shape: nuclear enlargement, nuclear elongation, and nuclear overlapping and crowding. Loss of nuclear polarity, with nuclei at the lumen, middle, or basal zone of the cells is also a helpful finding.
- Nuclear membrane irregularities: irregular nuclear contours, nuclear grooves and folds, "rat-bites" or demi-lune formations, and the presence of intranuclear cytoplasmic inclusions.
- Nuclear chromatin characteristics: nuclear chromatin clearing, often with condensation or margination along the nuclear membranes, resulting in accentuated nuclear margins, glassy nuclei, or fine, even delicate, powdery nuclear chromatin.

These features have been recently validated by an international group of practicing general surgical pathologists, showing a substantial interobserver agreement with applying a Nuclear Standardized Scoring System.

==== Exclusion criteria ====
1) Any invasion.

2) The presence of any other papillary thyroid carcinoma variant (examples would include tall cell, columnar cell, cribriform morular, diffuse sclerosing, etc.).

3) True papillary structures (a fibrovascular core surrounded by neoplastic cells). While originally limited to <1%, newer data suggests no papillary structures should be allowed.

4) Psammoma bodies. These are calcified remnants of papillary structures, and thus if a psammoma body is present anywhere within the tumor (in the correct location), then a NIFTP cannot be diagnosed.

5) Tumor necrosis: If there is true tumor necrosis not associated with a fine needle aspiration.

6) Increased mitoses: If there are ≥3 mitoses per 10 high-power fields, then this category cannot be used.

== Management ==
Lobectomy or surgical removal of one half of the thyroid gland that contains the nodule is currently all that seems to be required. However, it is important to realize that many clinical circumstances come into play when considering surgical options. If there are compression symptoms, cosmetic issues, hoarseness, or other factors in the patients clinical history (family risk factors, previous radiation for a different disorder, etc.), then a total thyroidectomy may be the prudent management. However, no additional surgery is necessary. Further, radiation therapy given as radioactive iodine is not necessary as it does not change the overall patient outcome, while being associated with potential side effects. The American Thyroid Association has released guidelines on thyroid tumor management, 2015 ATA Guidance on Differentiated Thyroid Cancer, which can be used as a guide for overall management.

== Prognosis ==
As long as the whole tumor was removed, and the whole periphery of the tumor has been evaluated microscopically—from tumor to capsule to parenchyma, or from tumor to parenchyma if no capsule is present—by the pathologist, who is able to document there is no capsular or lymphovascular invasion, then the risk of recurrence or occurrence does not develop.

== Epidemiology ==
The tumor is not new, just newly reclassified, and tumors previously diagnosed as the noninvasive encapsulated follicular variant of papillary thyroid carcinoma will now be classified according to the new terminology. Overall, about 20% of all thyroid gland "cancers" would now be classified as NIFTP. In Japan specifically, the diagnostic criteria and nomenclature for these tumors has been different, and so the incidence of this tumor type is different. The majority of patients are females (3-4:1 F:M), affecting a wide age range of patients, although most present during the 4th to the 6th decades of life.

== History ==
Patients in the distant past with this lesion would have been regarded as showing signs of having a benign lesion, a follicular adenoma. However, over time and with additional evaluation and molecular testing, these lesions came to be regarded as showing features of a papillary thyroid carcinoma because of their papillary carcinoma type nuclei. Thus, the "follicular variant" of a tumor that normally shows a papillary architecture and papillary nuclear features was named. Over the years, those cases that do not show invasion of either the capsule of the tumor or the vessels in the capsule, have been shown to behave in an indolent fashion, with only rare reported cases of metastatic disease.

Over a multiyear time frame, an international consensus project was undertaken to re-define the pathological criteria for the encapsulated follicular variant of papillary thyroid carcinoma. Based on a rigorous review of the literature and a multicentre review of many cases with long-term follow-up (a minimum of 10 years) together with molecular analysis of some tumors, this working group has determined that tumors previously classified as the encapsulated follicular variant of papillary carcinoma—without any evidence of capsular or vascular invasion, provided that the entire periphery of the tumor (capsule if encapsulated or periphery if well circumscribed) has been sampled—can be reclassified as noninvasive follicular thyroid neoplasms with papillary-like nuclear features. There are several major inclusion and exclusion criteria.

By consensus the tumors had to be more than 1 centimeter (0.39 in) in size, with no vascular or capsular invasion in an adequately sampled tumor, no other invasive tumors in the gland, no radioablative iodine treatment, and with at least 10 years of follow-up. With additional research, a clinically detected less than 1 cm tumor may qualify, but as there is a designation of "microscopic" for these tumors already, a further sub classification is not necessary.
