= Poorly differentiated thyroid cancer =

Poorly differentiated thyroid carcinoma
- Other names: PDTC
- Specialty: Oncology

Poorly differentiated thyroid carcinoma is malignant neoplasm of follicular cell origin showing intermediate histopathological patterns between differentiated and undifferentiated thyroid cancers.

== Histopathology ==
- Presence of small cells with round nuclei and scant cytoplasm with a diffuse solid pattern
- Round or oval nests (insulae) or in trabeculae.
- Solid growth and presence of microfollicles, some of which contain dense colloid.
- Extrathyroidal extension and blood vessel invasion
- Foci of necrosis,
- Larger than 5 cm in greatest diameter at diagnosis

== Epidemiology ==
- PDTC affects predominantly females about 55 years of age
