= Papillary thyroid cancer =

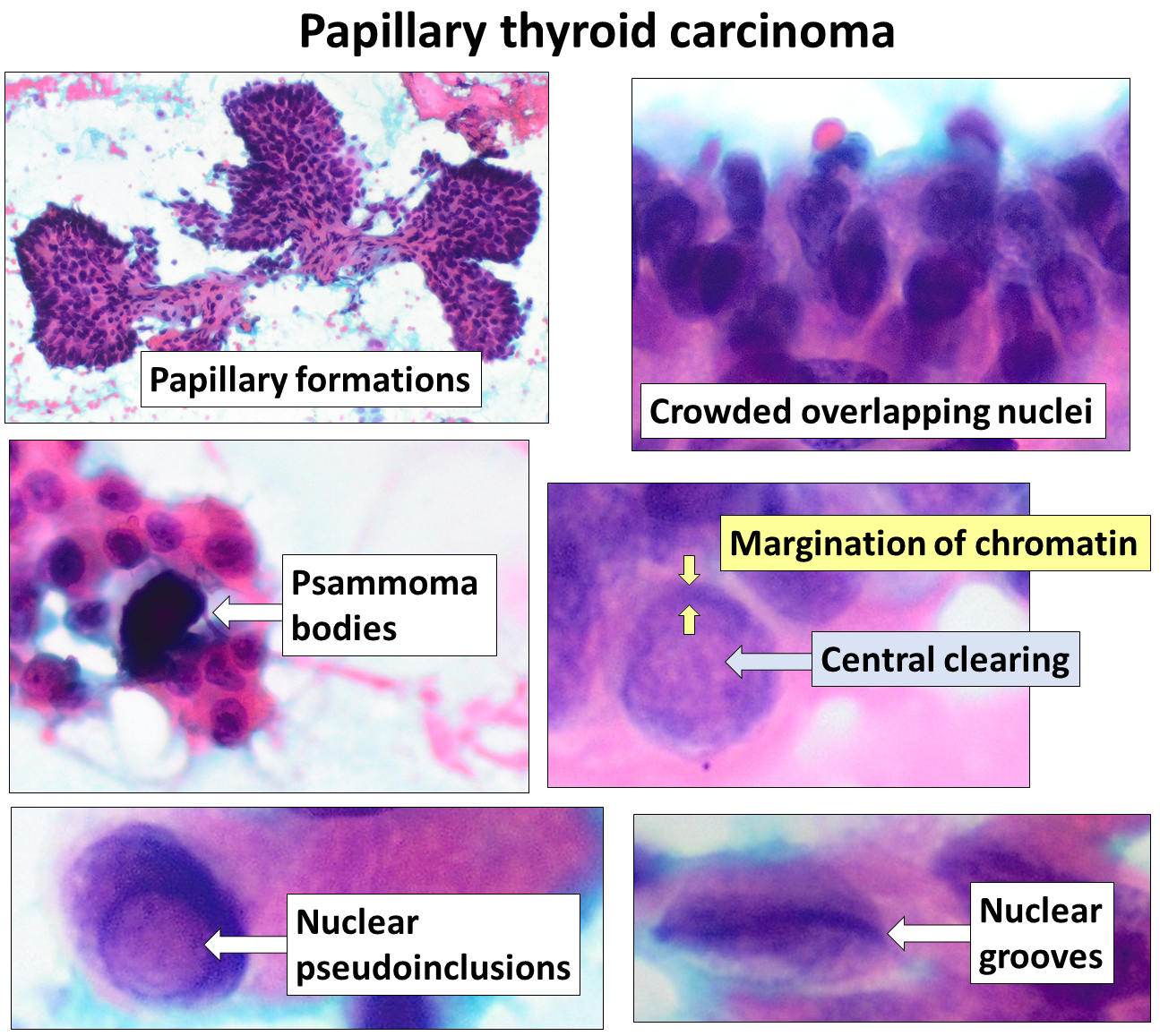
- Cytopathology of papillary thyroid carcinoma, with typical features (Pap stain).
- Specialty: ENT surgery

Papillary thyroid cancer (papillary thyroid carcinoma), sometimes written as PTC, is the most common type of thyroid cancer, representing 75 percent to 85 percent of all thyroid cancer cases. It occurs more frequently in those belonging to the 20–55 year age group. It is also the predominant cancer type in children with thyroid cancer, and in patients with thyroid cancer who have had previous radiation to the head and neck. It is often well-differentiated, slow-growing, and localized, although it can metastasize. Incidence of papillary thyroid carcinoma appears to have been increasing in recent years, especially young adults. Greater than 25% of those who have had PTC experience recurrence.

== Diagnosis ==
Papillary thyroid carcinoma is usually discovered during routine examination as an asymptomatic thyroid nodule that appears as a neck mass. In some instances, the mass may have produced local symptoms. This mass is normally referred to a fine needle aspiration biopsy (FNA) for investigation. FNA accuracy is very high and it is a process widely used in these cases. Other investigation methods include ultrasound imaging and nuclear scan. The ultrasound is a useful test to distinguish solid from cystic lesions and to identify calcifications. The thyroid ultrasound is also very effective to discover microcarcinomas, which refer to very small carcinomas (<1 cm).

Papillary thyroid carcinomas are also discovered when a hard nodule is found in multinodular goiter, when enlarged cervical lymph nodes are detected, or when there are unidentified metastatic lesions elsewhere in the body. Expanding lesions found in the thyroid gland, especially if they are painful, should be examined as they may indicate the presence of papillary thyroid carcinoma. Other clinical signs that could indicate papillary thyroid are fixation to the trachea, a firm neck mass, damage to recurrent laryngeal or cervical sympathetic nerves. Five percent of the population can have thyroid nodules, and the majority will be benign.

Appropriate workup includes an ultrasound of the neck, followed by lab studies. Patients will usually meet with both an endocrinologist and a surgeon (head and neck surgeon or endocrine surgeon).

=== Markers ===
Thyroglobulin can be used as a tumor marker for well-differentiated papillary thyroid cancer. HBME-1 staining may be useful for differentiating papillary carcinomas from follicular carcinomas; in papillary lesions it tends to be positive.

Reduced expression of ATP5F1E is significantly associated with the diagnosis of papillary thyroid cancer and may serve as an early tumor marker of the disease. Serum microRNAs have shown good diagnostic performance for distinguishing patients with papillary thyroid cancer from patients with benign thyroid nodules and healthy controls, and are suggested as novel and minimally invasive diagnostic approach in clinical practice.

=== Pathology ===
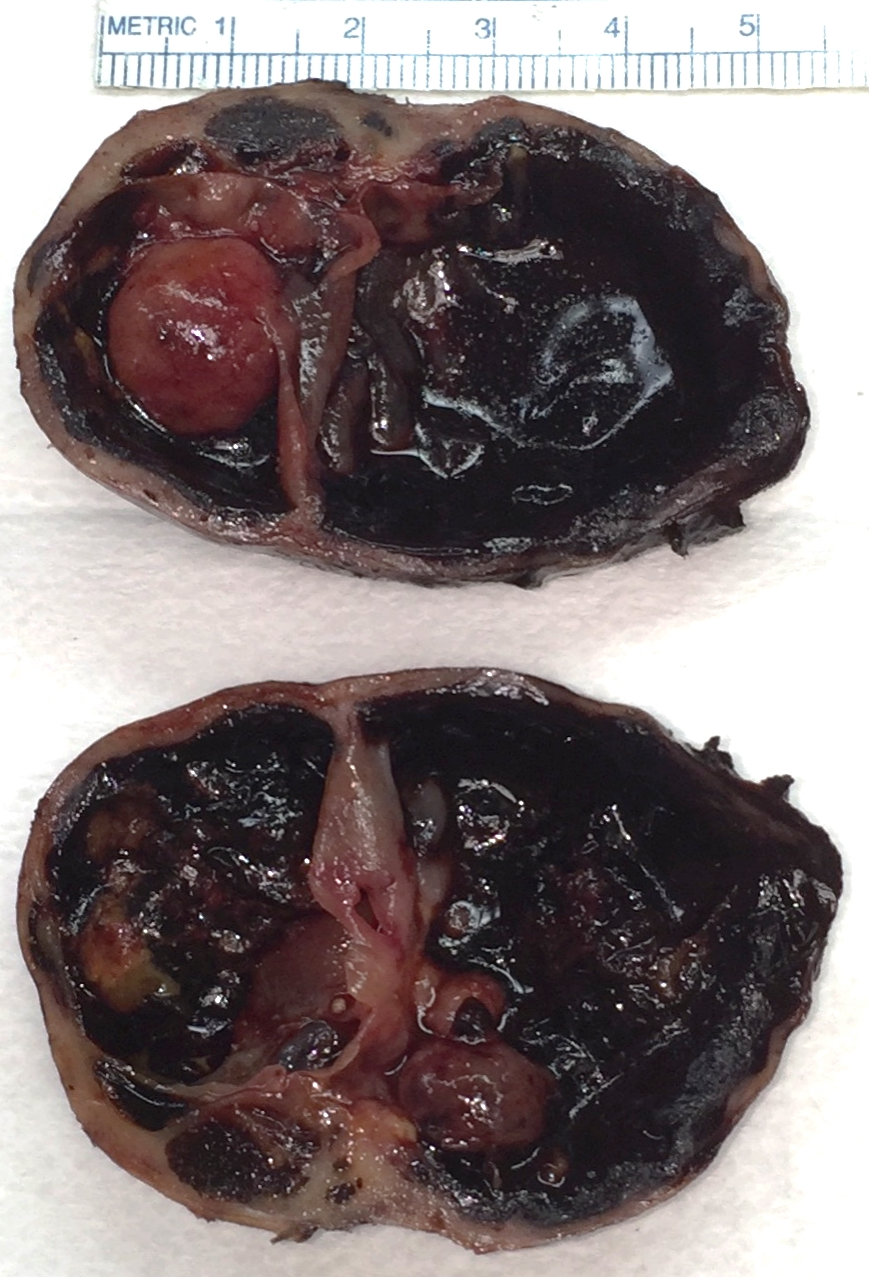
Gross appearance of papillary carcinoma of thyroid gland

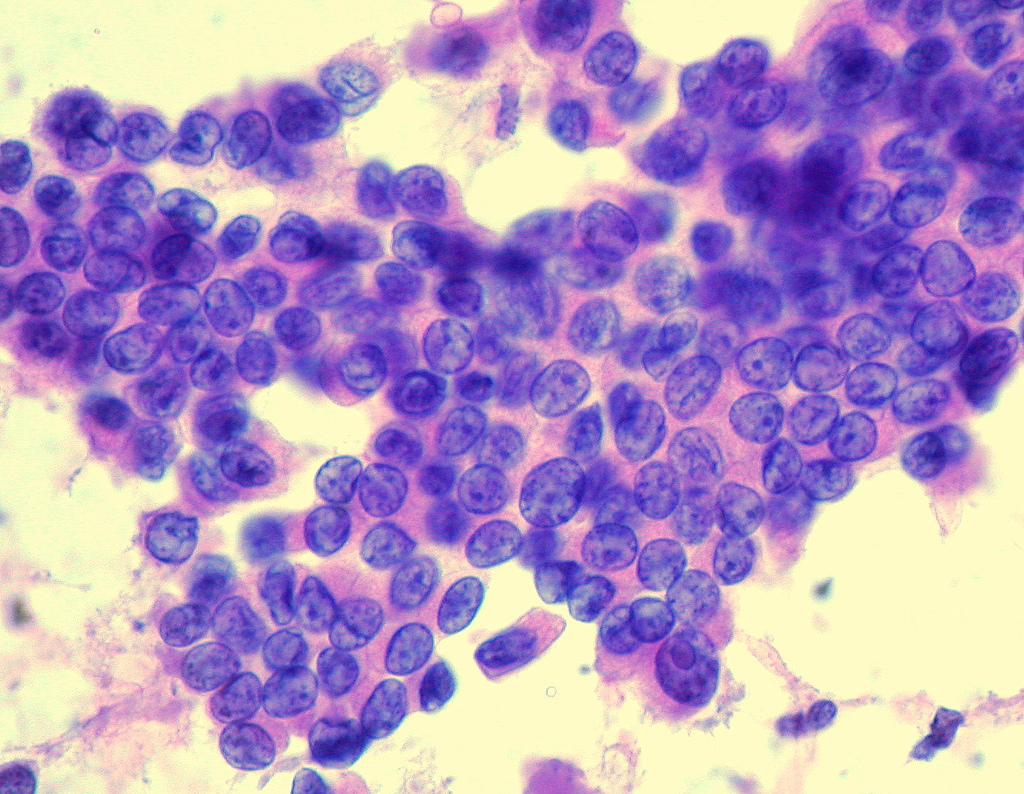
Papillary thyroid carcinoma

Papillary thyroid cancer gets its name from the papillae among its cells, visible on microscopy. Features include:

- Characteristic Orphan Annie eye nuclear clearings (nuclei with uniform staining, which appear empty due to powdery chromatin and marginal micronucleoli) and psammoma bodies on light microscopy. The former is useful in identifying the follicular variant of papillary thyroid carcinomas.
- Lymphatic spread is more common than hematogenous spread
- Multifocality is common
- The so-called lateral aberrant thyroid is usually a lymph node metastasis from a papillary thyroid carcinoma.
- Papillary microcarcinoma is a subset of papillary thyroid cancer defined as measuring less than or equal to 1 cm. The highest incidence of papillary thyroid microcarcinoma in an autopsy series was reported by Harach et al. in 1985, who found 36 of 101 consecutive autopsies to have an incidental microcarcinoma. Michael Pakdaman et al. report the highest incidence in a retrospective surgical series at 49.9 percent of 860 cases. Management strategies for incidental papillary microcarcinoma on ultrasound (and confirmed on FNAB) range from total thyroidectomy with radioactive iodine ablation to observation alone. Harach et al. suggest using the term "occult papillary tumor" to avoid giving patients distress over having cancer. It was Woolner et al. who first arbitrarily coined the term "occult papillary carcinoma" in 1960, to describe papillary carcinomas ≤ 1.5 cm in diameter.

Several variants are recognized, although classic papillary thyroid carcinoma is the most frequent: microscopic-follicular variant, diffuse-sclerosing variant, tall-cell variant, columnar-cell variant, hobnail variant, and others. The encapsulated-follicular variant, specifically when noninvasive, has been newly reclassified as the noninvasive follicular thyroid neoplasm with papillary-like nuclear features.

Although papillary carcinoma has a propensity to invade lymphatics, it is less likely to invade blood vessels. These kinds of tumors are most commonly unencapsulated, and they have a high tendency to metastasize locally to lymph nodes, which may produce cystic structures near the thyroid that are difficult to diagnose because of the paucity of malignant tissue. Furthermore, papillary tumors may metastasize to the lungs and produce a few nodules or the lung fields may exhibit a snowflake appearance throughout.

Other characteristics of the papillary carcinoma is that E.M. shows increased mitochondria, increased RER, as well as increased apical microvilli. Moreover, papillary carcinomas have an indolent growth, and 40 percent of cases spread out of the capsule.

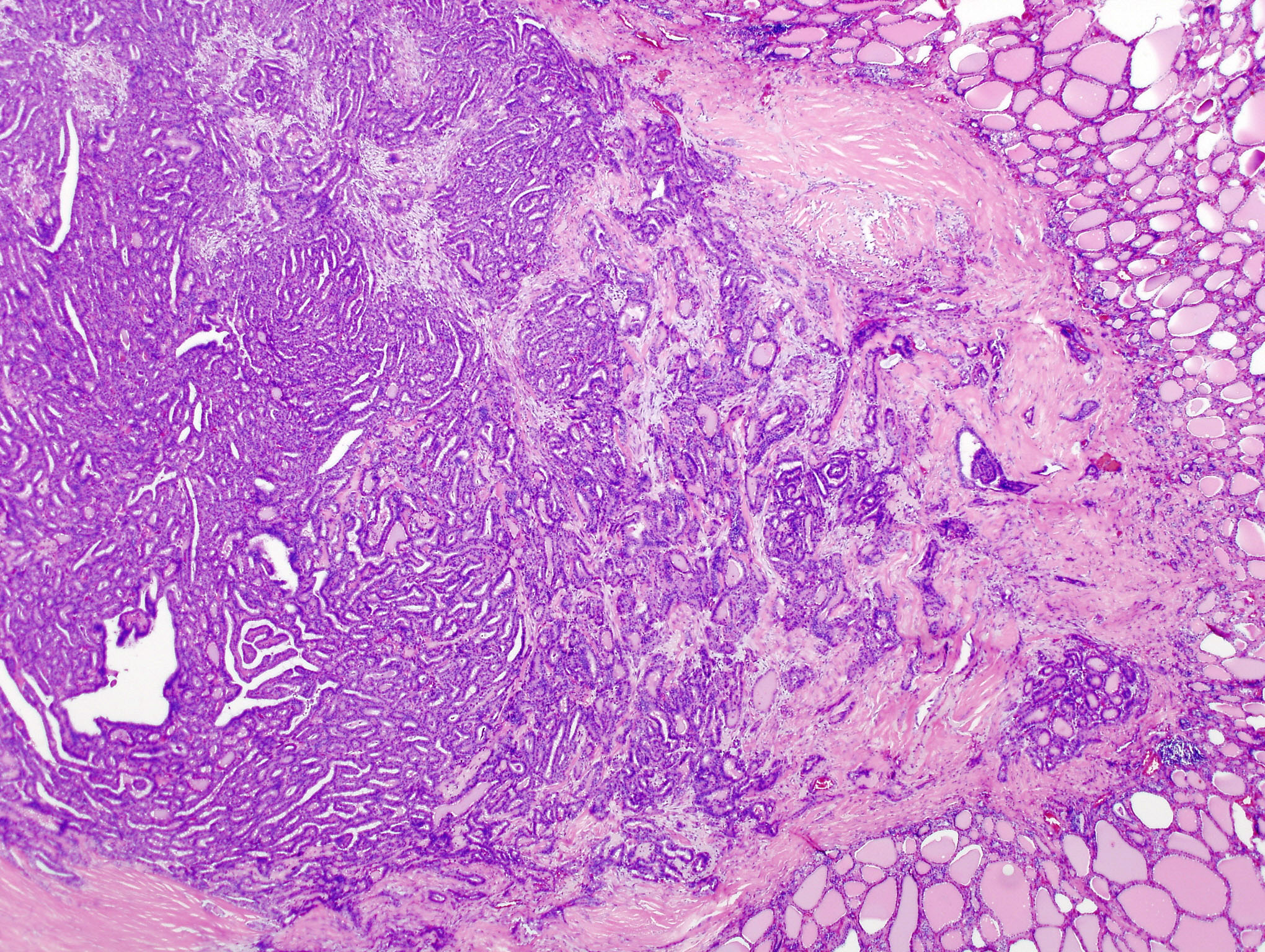
Micrograph of papillary thyroid carcinoma demonstrating prominent papillae with fibrovascular cores. H&E stain.

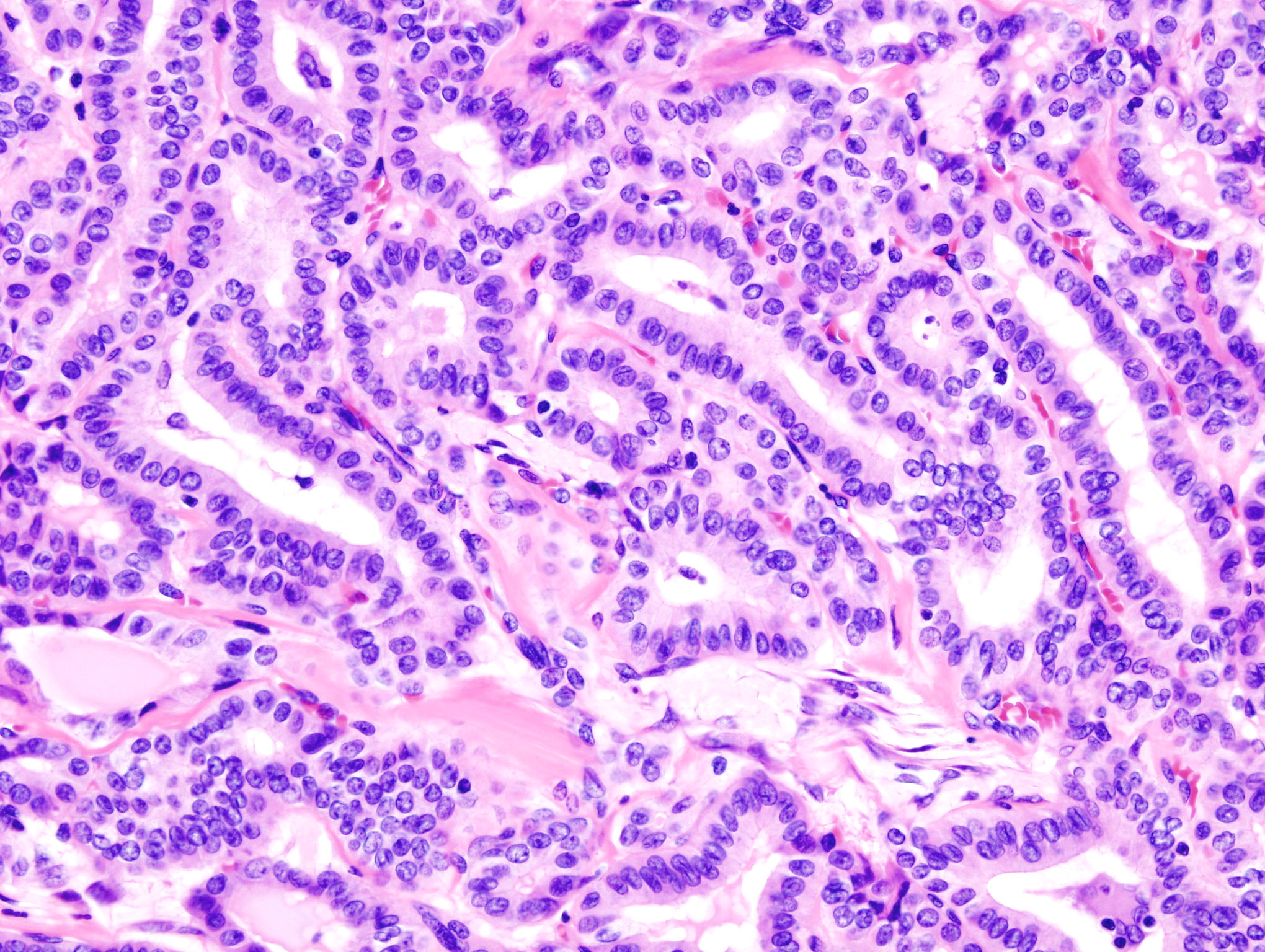
Micrograph showing that the papillae in papillary thyroid carcinoma are composed of cuboidal cells. H&E stain.

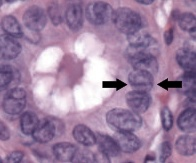
Nuclear grooves (arrows indicate one of them)

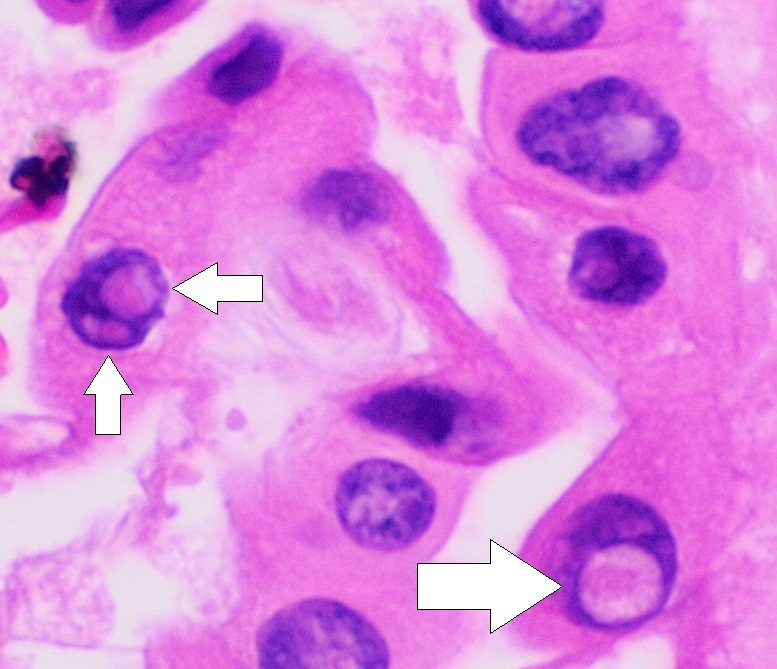
Nuclear pseudoinclusions, which are invaginations of cytoplasm into the nucleus.

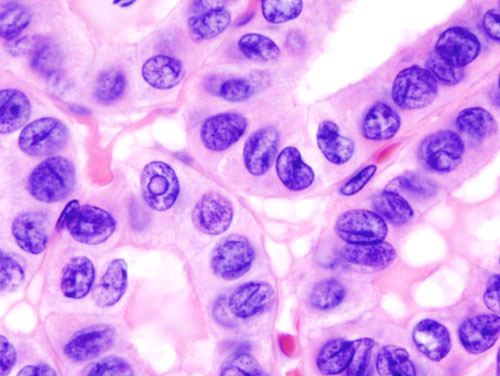
Micrograph (high power view) showing nuclear changes in papillary thyroid carcinoma (PTC), which include groove formation, optical clearing, eosinophilic inclusions and overlapping of nuclei. H&E stain.

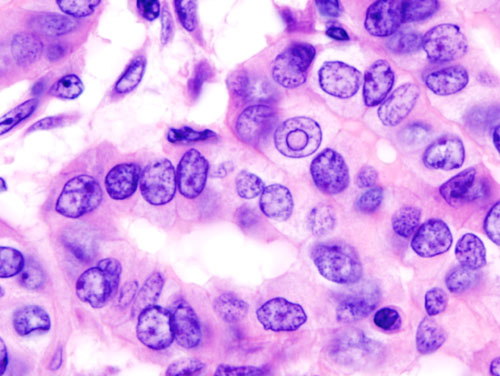
Micrograph (high power view) of PTC demonstrating nuclear clearing and overlapping nuclei. H&E stain.

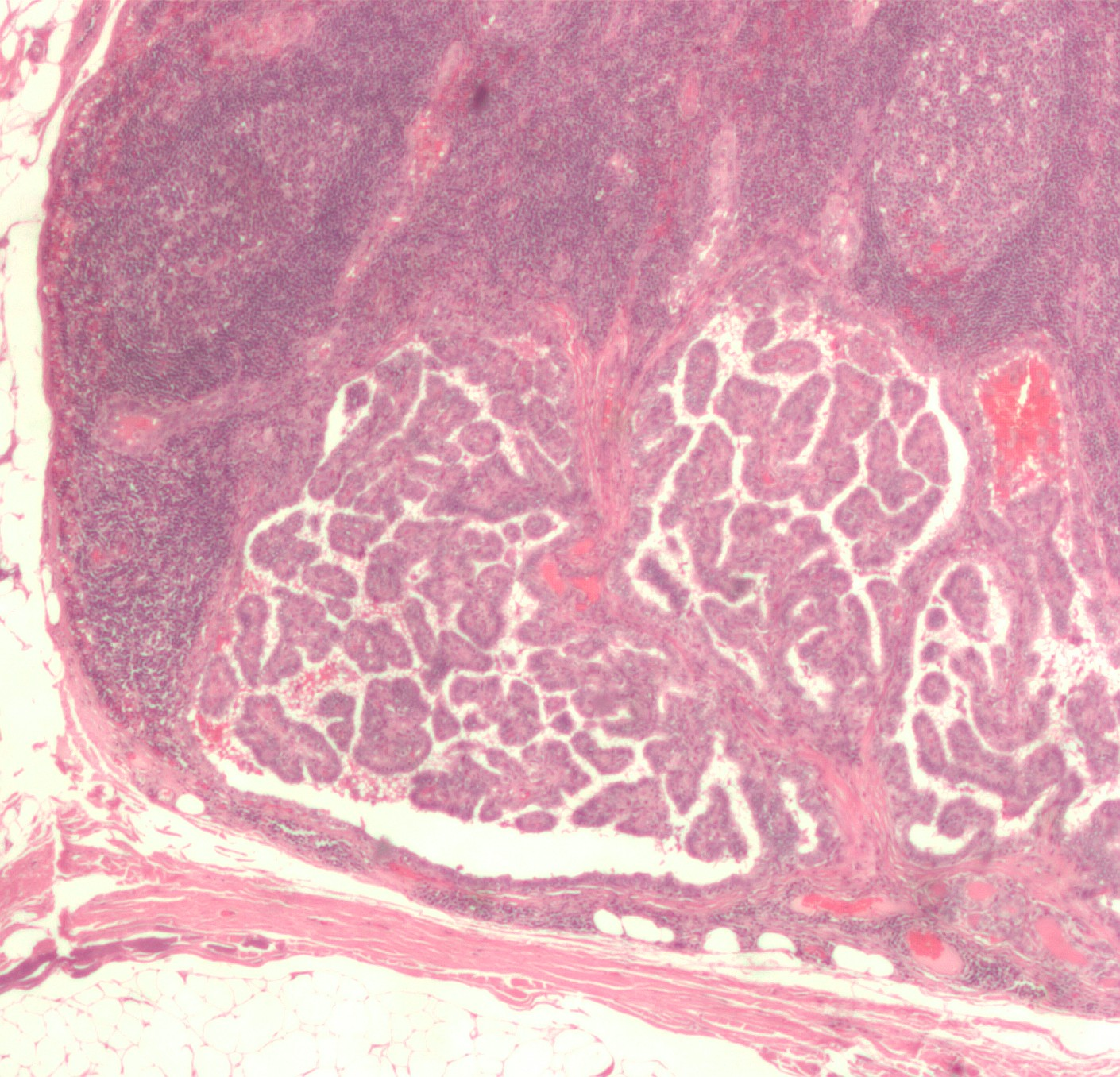
Micrograph of metastatic papillary thyroid carcinoma to a lymph node. H&E stain.

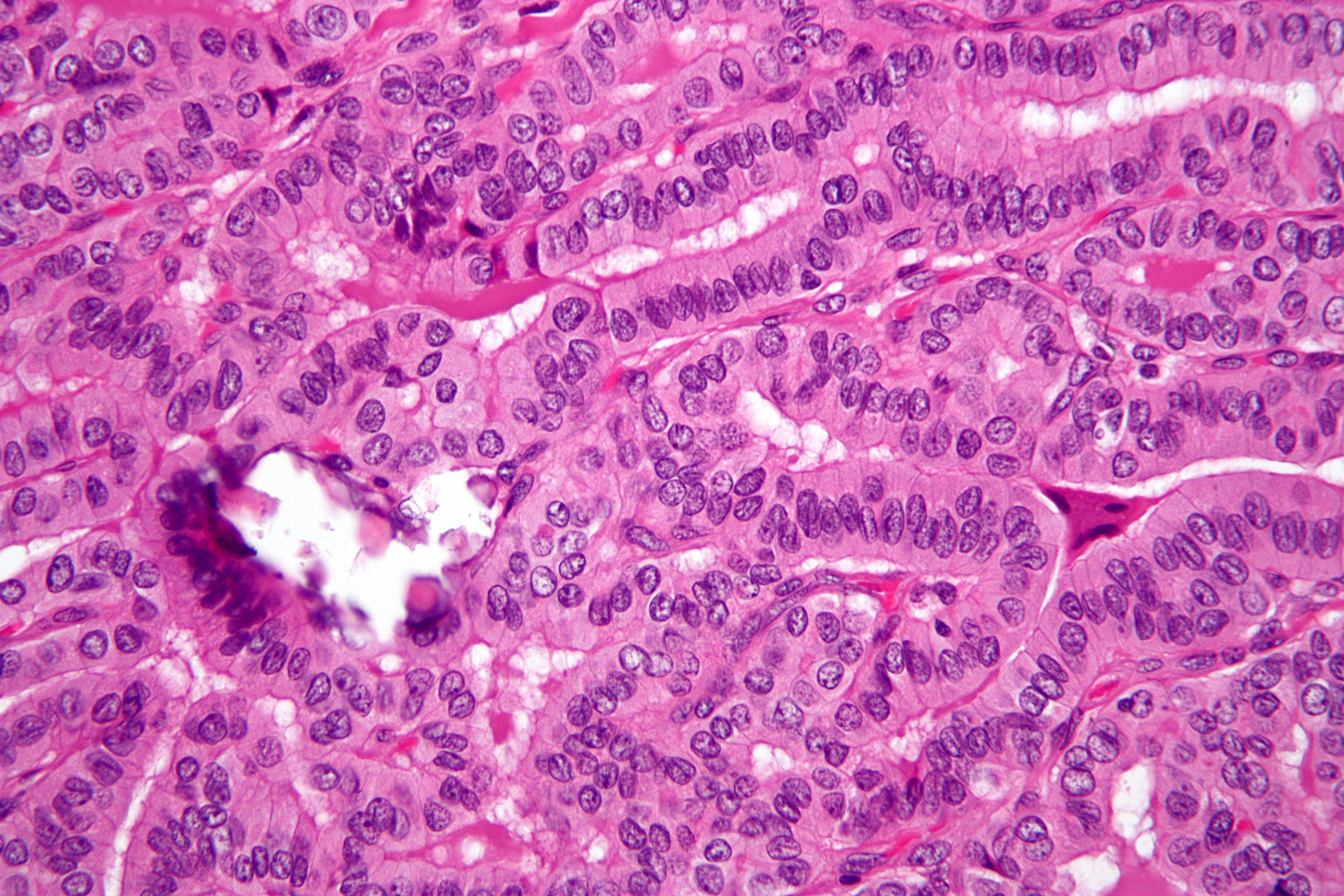
Micrograph of papillary thyroid carcinoma, tall cell variant - high magnification. H&E stain.

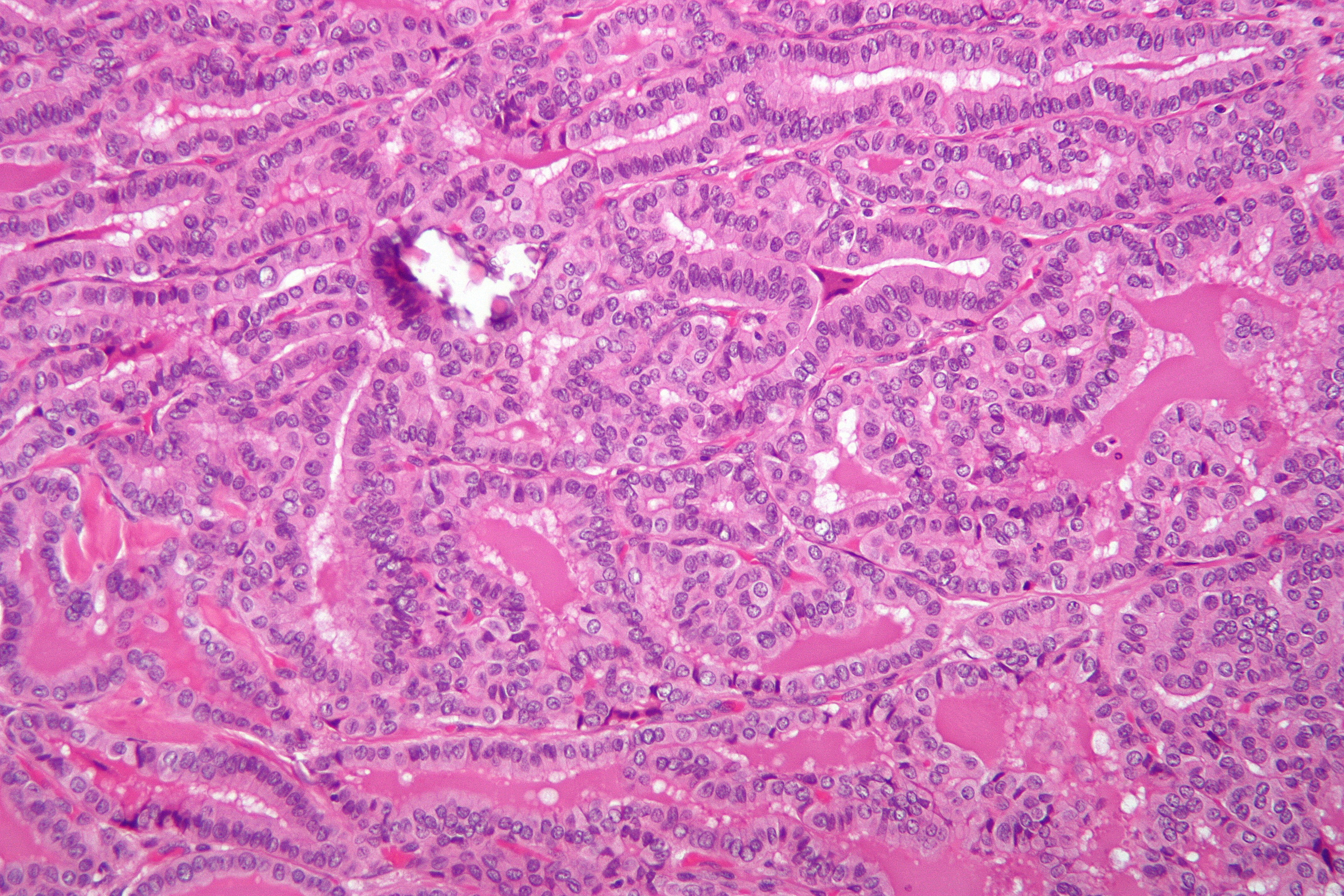
Micrograph of papillary thyroid carcinoma, tall cell variant - intermediate magnification. H&E stain.

=== Associated mutations ===
Mutations associated with papillary thyroid cancer are mainly two forms of chromosomal translocation and one form of point mutation. These alterations lead to activation of a common carcinogenic pathway—the MAPK/ERK pathway.

Chromosomal translocations involving the RET proto-oncogene (encoding a tyrosine kinase receptor that plays essential roles in the development of neuroendocrine cells) located on chromosome 10q11 occur in approximately a fifth of papillary thyroid cancers. The fusion oncoproteins generated are termed RET/PTC proteins (ret/papillary thyroid carcinoma), and constitutively activate RET and the downstream MAPK/ERK pathway. The frequency of ret/PTC translocations is significantly higher in papillary cancers arising in children and after radiation exposure. The gene NTRK1 (encoding the TrkA receptor), located on chromosome 1q, is similarly translocated in approximately 5 percent to 10 percent of papillary thyroid cancers.

Approximately a third to a half of papillary thyroid carcinomas harbor point mutations in the BRAF oncogene, also activating the MAPK/ERK pathway. In those cases the BRAF mutations found were V600E mutation. After performing a multivariate analysis, it was found that the absence of tumor capsule was the only parameter associated (P=0.0005) with BRAF V600E mutation. According to recent studies, papillary cancers carrying the common V600E mutation tend to have a more aggressive long-term course. BRAF mutations are frequent in papillary carcinoma and in undifferentiated cancers that have developed from papillary tumors.

Many more changes in gene expression are currently being investigated. Previous studies demonstrated the dysregulation of different microRNAs in thyroid cancer. For example, downregulation of miR-369-3p and consequent upregulation of its target TSPAN13 appear to be involved in the pathophysiology of PTC.

Mitochondrial mutations: MtDNA(mitochondrial) haplogroups, characterized by unique sets of non pathological mtDNA polymorphisms can modulate the pathogenesis of different diseases in specific populations because of its influence on the expression of genes related to ROS production and OXPHOS coupling efficiency and the regulation of apoptosis. In Asian populations, haplogroup D4a is associated with an increased risk of thyroid cancer while in European populations, Haplogroup K is considered to be protective of Thyroid cancer.

== Treatment ==
Surgery remains the mainstay of treatment for papillary thyroid cancer. The Revised 2009 American Thyroid Association guidelines for papillary thyroid cancer state that the initial procedure should be near-total or total thyroidectomy. Thyroid lobectomy alone may be sufficient treatment for small (<1 cm), low-risk, unifocal, intrathyroidal papillary carcinomas in the absence of prior head and neck irradiation or radiologically or clinically involved cervical nodal metastasis.

- Minimal disease (diameter up to 1.0 centimeters) - hemithyroidectomy (or unilateral lobectomy) and isthmectomy may be sufficient. There is some discussion whether this is still preferable over total thyroidectomy for this group of patients.
- Gross disease (diameter over 1.0 centimeters) - total thyroidectomy, and central compartment lymph node removal is the therapy of choice. Additional lateral neck nodes can be removed at the same time if an ultrasound guided FNA and thyroglobulin TG cancer washing was positive on the pre-operative neck node ultrasound evaluation.

Arguments for total thyroidectomy are:

- Reduced risk of recurrence, if central compartment nodes are removed at the original surgery.
- 30-85% of papillary carcinoma is multifocal disease. Hemithyroidectomy may leave disease in the other lobe. However, multifocal disease in the remnant lobe may not necessarily become clinically significant or serve as a detriment to patient survival.
- Ease of monitoring with thyroglobulin (sensitivity for picking up recurrence is increased in presence of total thyroidectomy, and ablation of the remnant normal thyroid by low dose radioiodine 131 after following a low iodine diet (LID).
- Ease of detection of metastatic disease by thyroid and neck node ultrasound.
- Post-operative complications at high-volume thyroid surgery centers with experienced surgeons are comparable to that of hemithyroidectomy.

Arguments for hemithyroidectomy:

- Most patients have low-risk cancer with an excellent prognosis, with similar survival outcomes in low-risk patients who undergo total thyroidectomy versus hemithyroidectomy.
- Less likelihood of patient requiring lifelong thyroid hormone replacement after surgery.

Thyroid total body scans are less reliable at finding recurrence than TG and ultrasound.

Papillary tumors tend to be more aggressive in patients over age 45. In such cases, it might be required to perform a more extensive resection including portions of the trachea. Also, the sternocleidomastoid muscle, jugular vein, and accessory nerve are to be removed if such procedure allows apparently complete tumor resection. If a significant amount of residual tumor is left in the neck, external radiotherapy has been indicated and has proven useful especially in those cases when the residual tumor does not take up radioiodine.

After surgical thyroid removal, the patient waits around 4–6 weeks to then have radioiodine therapy. This therapy is intended to both detect and destroy any metastasis and residual tissue in the thyroid. The treatment may be repeated 6–12 months after initial treatment of metastatic disease where disease recurs or has not fully responded.

Patients are administered hormone replacement levothyroxine for life after surgery, especially after total thyroidectomy. Chemotherapy with cisplatin or doxorubicin has proven limited efficacy, however, it could be helpful for patients with bone metastases to improve their quality of life. Patients are also prescribed levothyroxine and radioiodine after surgery. Levothyroxine influences growth and maturation of tissues and it is involved in normal growth, metabolism, and development. In case of metastases, patients are prescribed antineoplastic agents which inhibit cell growth and proliferation and help in palliating symptoms in progressive disease.

After successful treatment, 35 percent of the patients may experience a recurrence within a 40-year span. Also, patients may experience a high incidence of nodule metastasis, with 35 percent cases of cervical node metastases. Approximately 20 percent of patients will develop multiple tumors within the thyroid gland.

There is ongoing discussion regarding the best management regarding the optimal surgical procedure for papillary thyroid cancer. Prognosis of patients with papillary thyroid cancer is found to be dependent on the patient's age, the size of the tumor, presence of metastatic disease, and the presence of tumor invasion into adjacent tissues near the thyroid gland. Recent studies have examined a more conservative approach to surgery and have demonstrated that hemithyroidectomy may be acceptable for patients with low-risk papillary thyroid cancer with tumor size 1 cm to 4 cm with no presence of invasion to tissues surrounding the thyroid or metastasis. Studies examining large databases of patients with papillary thyroid cancer have concluded that there is no survival advantage for patients with stage I papillary thyroid cancer size 1–4 cm receiving total thyroidectomy versus hemithyroidectomy. In light of this data, choosing the optimal course of surgical and medical management of papillary thyroid cancer should involve shared decision making from patient, endocrinologists, and surgeons.

== Prognosis ==
The reported overall five year survival rate for papillary thyroid cancer varies, with some studies reporting 96 percent or 97 percent, with a 10-year survival rate of 93 percent.

For a more specific prognosis for individual cases, there are at minimum 13 known scoring systems for prognosis; among the more often used are:

- AGES - Age, Grade, Extent of disease, Size
- AMES - Age, Metastasis, Extent of disease, Size
- MACIS - Metastasis, Age at presentation, Completeness of surgical resection, Invasion (extrathyroidal), Size (this is a modification of the AGES system). It is probably the most reliable staging method available. Also known as the MAICS system.
- TNM staging - Tumor, node, metastasis. Remarkable about the TNM staging for (differentiated) thyroid carcinoma is that the scoring is different according to age.

=== MACIS ===
The MACIS system of estimating the prognosis of papillary thyroid cancer was developed by Clive S. Grant at the Mayo Clinic and was based on careful evaluation of a large group of patients. It is probably the most reliable staging method available.

It assigns scores to the main factors involved and uses the sum of this score to calculate the prognosis:

Factors		Score
Distant Metastasis: spread of the cancer to areas outside the neck	Yes	3
Distant Metastasis: spread of the cancer to areas outside the neck	No	0
Age at the time the tumor was discovered	Less than 39 years	3.1
Age at the time the tumor was discovered	Over 40 years	0.08 x age
Invasion into surrounding areas of the neck as seen by the naked eye	Yes	1
Invasion into surrounding areas of the neck as seen by the naked eye	No	0
Completeness of surgical resection (or removal) of the tumor	Incomplete	1
Completeness of surgical resection (or removal) of the tumor	Complete	0
Size of the tumor		0.3 x size in cm

Sum of MACIS score	20 yr Survival
< 6.0	99%
6.0 - 6.99	89%
7.0 - 7.99	56%
> 8.0	24%

Most patients fall into the low-risk category (MACIS score less than 6.0) and are cured of the cancer at the time of surgery.

Children with multiple lung metastases and/or a miliary aspect still have an excellent long-term prognosis if given adequate treatment.

=== Stage ===
Based on overall cancer staging into stages I to IV, papillary thyroid cancer has a 5-year survival rate of 100 percent for stages I and II, 93 percent for stage III and 51 percent for stage IV.

== Epidemiology ==
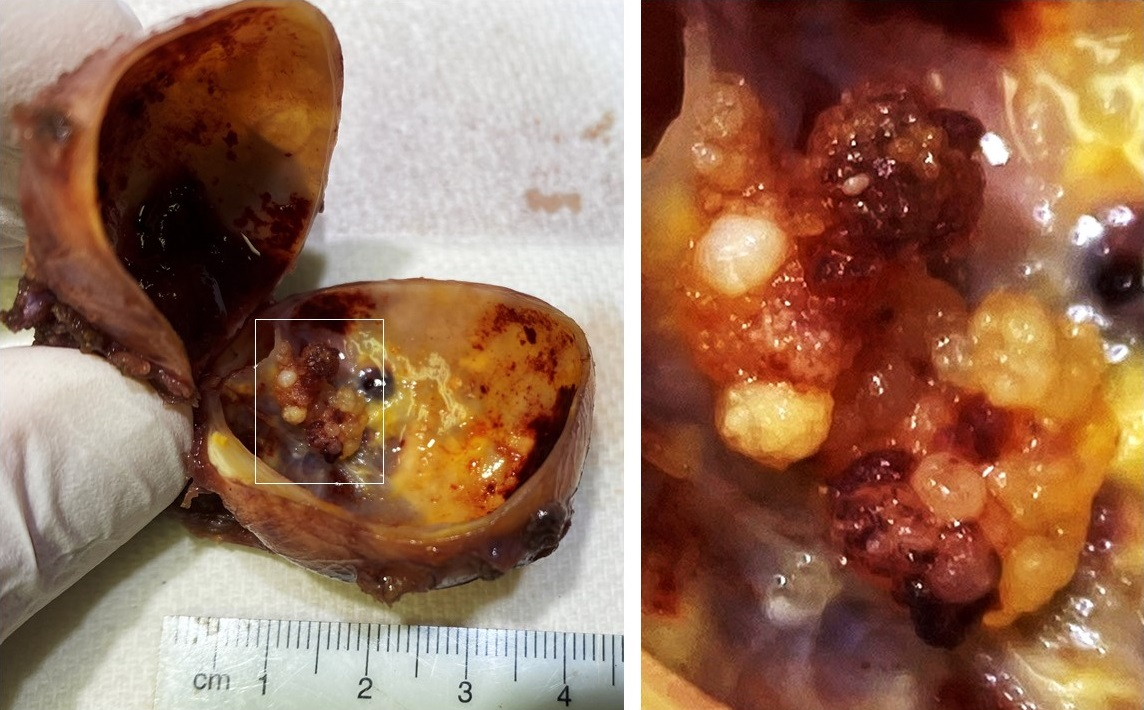
Papillary thyroid cancer (magnified at right) arising within ectopic thyroid tissue of a thyroglossal cyst is a rare occurrence (less than 1% of such cysts).

According to Surveillance, Epidemiology, and End Results (SEER), the incidence of papillary cancer has increased from 4.8 to 14.9 per 100,000 from 1975 to 2012. Females are more likely to get papillary cancer when compared to males with incidence ratio of 2.5 to 1 where most of the cancers are diagnosed between 40 and 50 years old in females. However, death rates from papillary cancer remains static from 2003 to 2012 at 0.5 per 100,000 men and women. There was an increased incidence of papillary cancer from 1910 to 1960 due to the use of ionising radiation in treating childhood head and neck cancers. The incidence decreased after radiation therapy was abandoned. Environmental exposures to radiation such as atomic bombings of Hiroshima and Nagasaki and Chernobyl disaster also causes an increase in childhood papillary thyroid cancer at 5 to 20 years after the exposure to radiation. Family history of thyroid cancer syndrome such as familial adenomatous polyposis, Carney complex, Multiple endocrine neoplasia type 2 (MEN-2), Werner syndrome, and Cowden syndrome increases the risk of getting papillary cancer.
