= Laser ablation of thyroid nodules =

- Specialty: Endocrinologist

Laser ablation of thyroid nodules is a minimally invasive procedure indicated to treat benign thyroid lesions such as cold nodules or single nodules within a multinodular goiter. The technique consists in the destruction of the tissue by the insertion therein of optical fibers which convey the light energy, causing a complete and not reversible lesions necrosis. The therapeutic outcome is the reduction in volume of the nodule, and as a result of local symptoms, such as compression, and reduction or loss of visibility of nodular goiter.

The goal of therapy is to destroy the lesion without removing the organ, thus preserving its normal anatomy.

Once documented the benign nature of the nodule, the selection criteria for treatment with the laser concern injuries sufficiently massive to create cosmetic damages or local compressive symptoms and those patients who have contraindications at surgery or anesthesia or will not, for aesthetic reasons, to undergo surgery.

== Technique ==
The laser ablation of thyroid nodules is performed in day hospital or day-surgery. The patient is placed under mild sedation (the same type of sedation used in an endoscopic examination). A local anesthetic is then applied, and one or two needles (depending on the size of the nodule) placed inside the nodule under ultrasound guidance. Through the lumen of the needles, extremely thin optical fibers are placed, which are connected to a laser light source. The total time of the procedure is about 30 minutes, with the laser energy applied for approximately 10–12 minutes.

== Advantages ==
Compared to drug therapy laser ablation has the advantages of immediacy and efficacy in single nodules and especially when they have already reached a certain volume. In these cases, the percutaneous laser ablation not only prevents the growth of the nodules but it induces a reduction in short times and without having to perform a therapy protracted over many years. Compared to surgery laser ablation does not induce late hypothyroidism, does not involve the presence of scars or any other cosmetic damage, not painful, is a day hospital procedure, and does not require hospitalization, is a short-term treatment (about 30 minutes - including the patient preparation), takes place in a conscious sedation state of the patient, which avoids any risk related to general anesthesia, produces predictable and repeatable volumes of necrosis, and does not affect further therapeutic actions.

== See also ==
- Laser-induced thermotherapy
- Laser ablation
- Laser-induced interstitial thermotherapy
