= Colloid nodule =

Benign enlargement of thyroid tissue

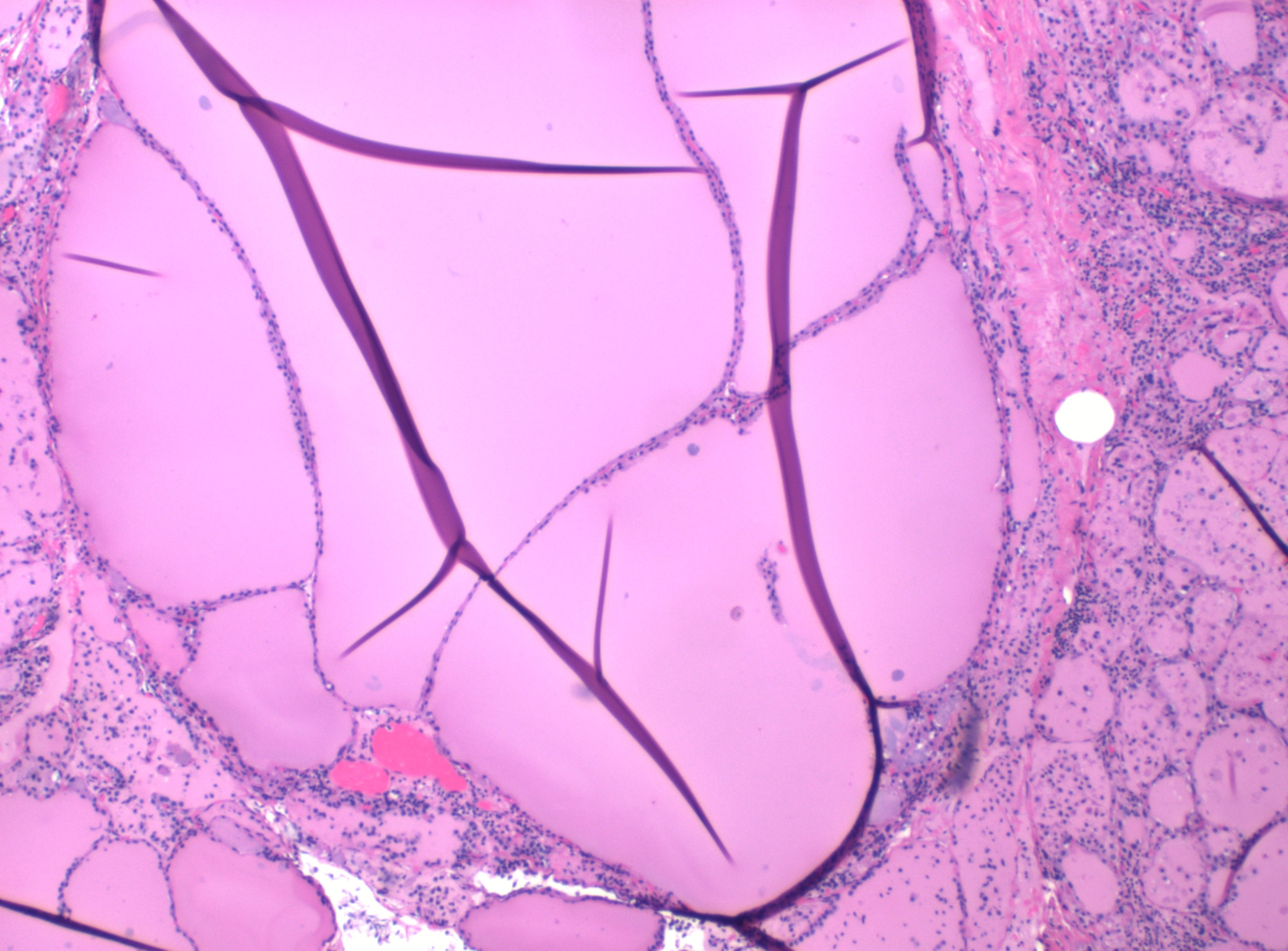
Histopathology of a colloid nodule of the thyroid, showing dilated thyroid follicles. There is some reactive fibrosis (at right) but no consistent capsule.

Colloid nodules, also known as adenomatous nodules or colloid nodular goiter are benign, noncancerous enlargement of thyroid tissue. Although they may grow large, and there may be more than one, they are not malignant and they will not spread beyond the thyroid gland. Colloid nodules are the most common kind of thyroid nodule.

== Presentation ==
Colloid nodules are usually small enough to be undetectable without an ultrasound or other imaging techniques. They usually produce no symptoms, so patients are unlikely to notice them until their size makes them easier to detect. Like other thyroid nodules, they are usually first noticed in a routine physical examination.

== Diagnosis ==
Colloid nodules may be initially identified as an unspecified kind of thyroid nodule. Follow-up examinations typically include an ultrasound if it is unclear whether or not there really is a nodule present. Once the presence of a nodule has been confirmed, the determination of the kind of thyroid nodule is done by fine needle aspiration biopsy.

Colloid nodules are distinguished by an apparently gelatinous mass of colloid both surrounding and contained within follicular cells. Colloid nodules are not surrounded by a fibrous capsule of compressed tissue. However, they are surrounded by flattened epithelial cells. Both the number of cells and the type of colloid may vary considerably.

== Treatment ==
No treatment is generally needed. Treatment may be indicated if follow up exams show significant change.

== See also ==
- Cold nodule
