= Cold nodule =

Medical condition

A cold nodule is a thyroid nodule that does not produce thyroid hormone. On a radioactive iodine uptake test a cold nodule takes up less radioactive material than the surrounding thyroid tissue. A cold nodule may be malignant or benign. On scintigraphy cold nodules do not show but are easily shown on ultrasound. Figure 1 illustrates the basic anatomy of the thyroid gland. The case shown in Figure 4 shows a cold nodule quite emphasized representation of the thyroid. The investigation was carried out due to a goiter rating of 3. Striking was the discrepancy between the magnification sonographically depicted the thyroid lobe and the findings in the scintigraphy; the lower part of the right lobe and the lateral part of the left missing in the bone scan, although demonstrably thyroid tissue is present there sonographically. This imperfective representation for thyroid tissue is the characteristic of a "cold node". Cold nodules are common in older women and are usually benign, with only 15-20% being malignant. In men or children, cold nodules are much less common, and presumed to be cancerous until proven otherwise.

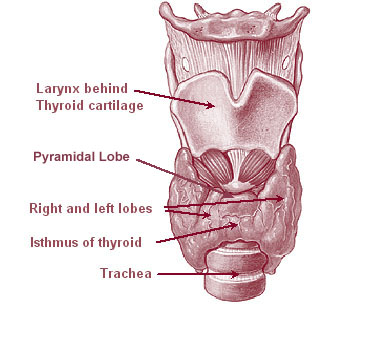
Fig. 1
Anatomy of the thyroid

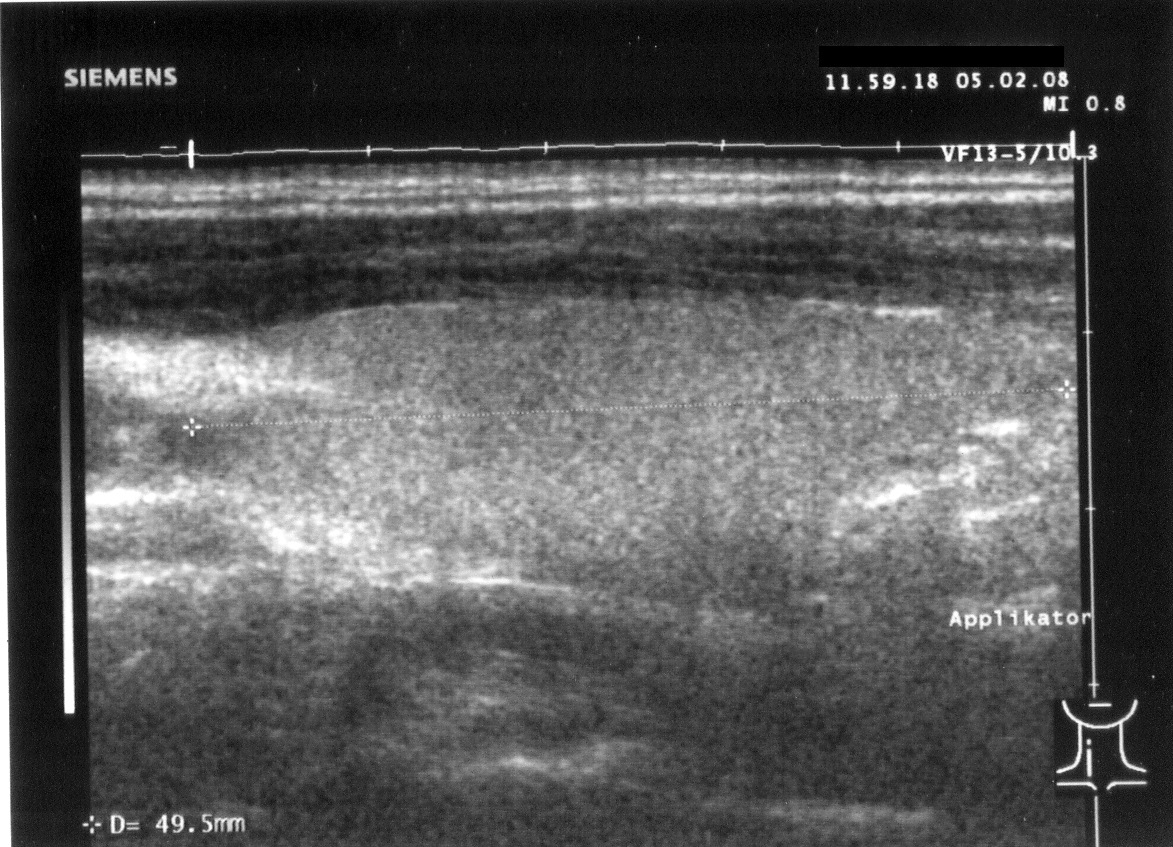
Fig. 2
Ultrasonic: Cross section of the right lobe

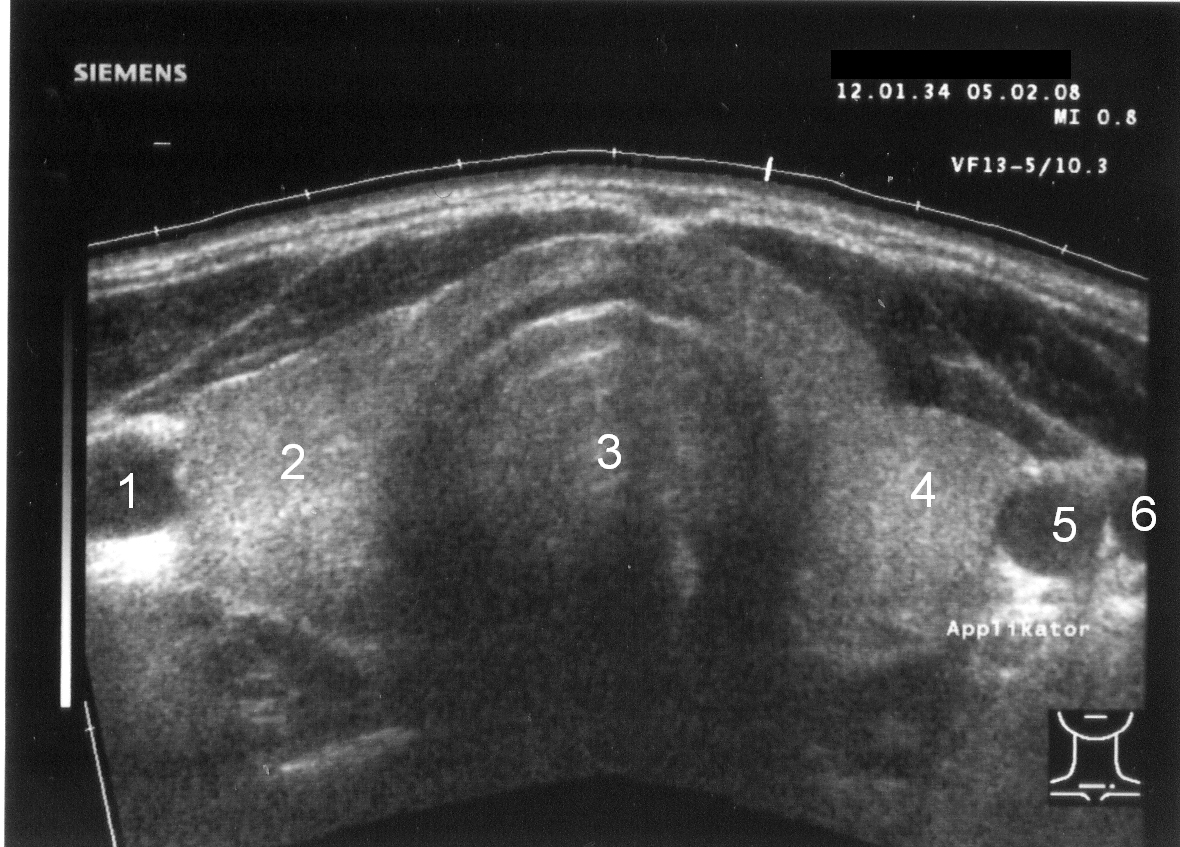
Fig. 3
Ultrasonic: Cross section of the thyroid

Fig. 4
Cold nodules

== See also ==
- Thyroid nodule
- Colloid nodule
