= Griffith's sign =

- Differential diagnosis: Graves' ophthalmopathy

Griffith's sign is a clinical sign in which there is lid lag of the lower eyelid on moving the eye upwards. It is found in Graves' ophthalmopathy.

== See also ==
- Von Graefe's sign
- Boston's sign
