= Karl Mellinger =

Karl Mellinger (26 November 1858, in Mainz – 21 May 1917, in Basel) was a German-Swiss ophthalmologist.

Mellinger studied medicine at the universities of Zürich and Basel until 1883, and afterwards worked as an assistant to ophthalmologists Johann Friedrich Horner in Zürich and Karl Stellwag von Carion at the University of Vienna. In 1889 he obtained his habilitation at Basel and was named head of the outpatient clinic. In 1896 he became an associate professor and successor to Heinrich Schiess-Gemuseus as head of the university eye clinic. Among his students and assistants at Basel were Alfred Vogt and August Siegrist. He is credited with introducing a specialized ring magnet (inner pole eye magnet) into ophthalmology.

== Selected writings ==
He was the author of around 30 scientific papers on various ophthalmic subjects, such as:

- Über die Magnet-Extractionen an der ophthalmologischen Klinik, 1887 – On magnetic extraction at the ophthalmologic clinic.
- Über die Wirkung unter die Bindehaut gespritzter Kochsalzlösungen, 1896 – On the effects of conjunctival injection of saline.
- Über die Behandlung der Aderhaut-Entzündung an der Macula, 1898 – Treatment for choroidal inflammation of the macula.
- Über schädliche Wirkung des Cocain, 1899 – On the adverse effects of cocaine.
- Über einen neuen Lid-Sperrer, 1899 – On a new eyelid retractor.
- Über den Innenpol-Magneten, 1908 – On the inner-pole magnet.
