= Schiess =

Schiess or Schieß is a surname. Notable people with the surname include:

- Albert Schiess (born 1951), Swiss sailor
- Betty Bone Schiess (1923–2017), American Episcopal priest
- Claudia Schiess (born 1989), Ecuadorian beauty queen
- Douglas Schiess (born 1970), American Space Force major general
- Emanuel Schiess (1875–1948), Swiss footballer
- Ferdinand Schiess (1856–1884), Swiss recipient of the Victoria Cross
- Gabriela Andersen-Schiess (born 1945), former Swiss long-distance runner
- Heinrich Schiess-Gemuseus (1833–1914), Swiss ophthalmologist
- Johann Ulrich Schiess (1813–1883), Swiss politician
- Louis Schiess (born 1925), Swiss sailor
- Robert Schiess (1896–1956), Swiss painter and member of the Pontifical Swiss Guard
- Walter Schiess (1898–1959), Swiss magazine editor
- Franz Schieß (1921–1943), German fighter ace

== See also ==
- The dictionary definition of schieß at Wiktionary
