= William Dalrymple (disambiguation) =

William Dalrymple is a Scottish historian and writer.

William Dalrymple may also refer to:

- William Dalrymple (politician, born 1678), Scottish Member of Parliament
- William Dalrymple (moderator) (1723–1814), Scottish minister and religious writer
- William Dalrymple (British Army officer) (1736–1807), Scottish general and MP for Wigtown Burghs and Duleek
- William Dalrymple (surgeon) (1772–1847), English surgeon

== See also ==
- William Dalrymple Maclagan (1826–1910), Archbishop of York
