= Von Graefe's sign =

- Differential diagnosis: exophthalmic goiter

Von Graefe's sign is the lagging of the upper eyelid on downward rotation of the eye, indicating exophthalmic goiter (Graves' disease). It is a dynamic sign, whereas lid lag is a static sign which may also be present in cicatricial eyelid retraction or congenital ptosis.

A pseudo Graefe's sign (pseudo lid lag) shows a similar lag, but is due to aberrant regeneration of fibres of the oculomotor nerve (III) into the elevator of the upper lid. It occurs in paramyotonia congenita. A pseudo Graefe's sign is most commonly manifested in just one eye but can occasionally be observed in both. The reason only one eye is affected is not yet clear.

== See also ==
- Albrecht von Gräfe
- Boston's sign
- Griffith's sign
- Graves orbitopathy
- Hyperthyroidism, as lid lag may be in hyperthyroid patients lacking Graves' disease.
