= Insulin-like growth factor 1 receptor =

Cell receptor protein found in humans

IGF1R
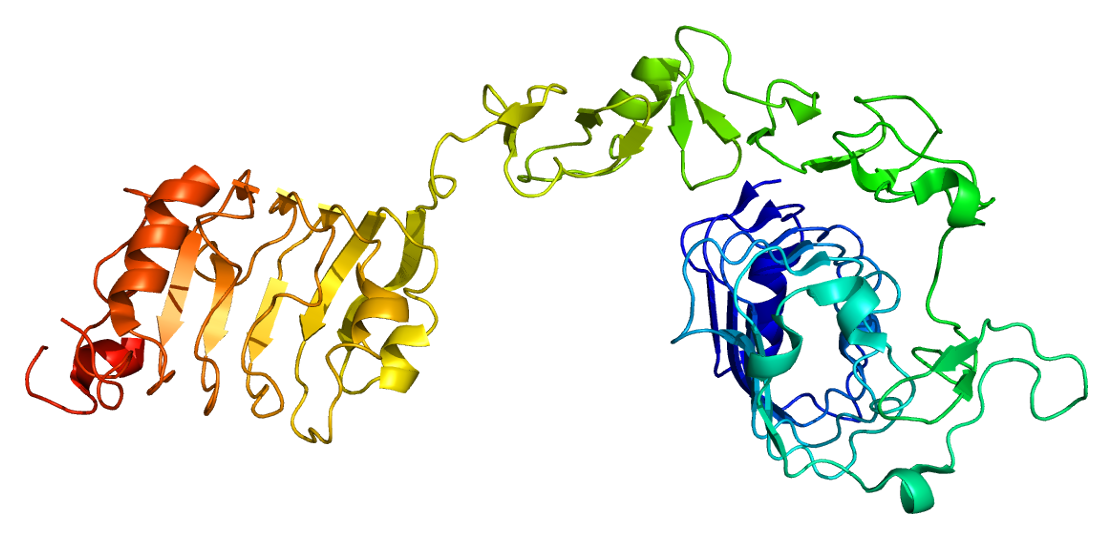

Identifiers
- Aliases: IGF1R, CD221, IGFIR, IGFR, JTK13, insulin like growth factor 1 receptor, Insulin-like growth factor 1，IGF-1R
- External IDs: OMIM: 147370; MGI: 96433; GeneCards: IGF1R
Available structures
PDB	Ortholog search: PDBe RCSB
PDB	List of PDB id codes 1IGR, 1JQH, 1K3A, 1M7N, 1P4O, 2OJ9, 2ZM3, 3D94, 3F5P, 3I81, 3LVP, 3LW0, 3NW5, 3NW6, 3NW7, 3O23, 3QQU, 4D2R, 4XSS, 5HZN
Enzyme activity
EC #	BRENDA	ExPASy	KEGG	MetaCyc
2.7.10.1	↗	↗	↗	↗

Gene location (Human)
Chr.	Chromosome 15 (human)
Band	15q26.3	Start	98,648,539 bp
Band	15q26.3	End	98,964,530 bp

Gene location (Mouse)
Chr.	Chromosome 7 (mouse)
Band	7 C|7 37.27 cM	Start	67,602,575 bp
Band	7 C|7 37.27 cM	End	67,883,416 bp
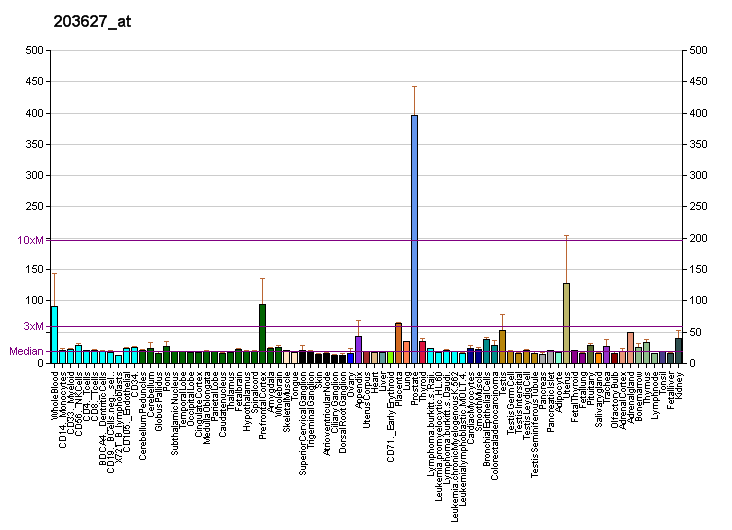

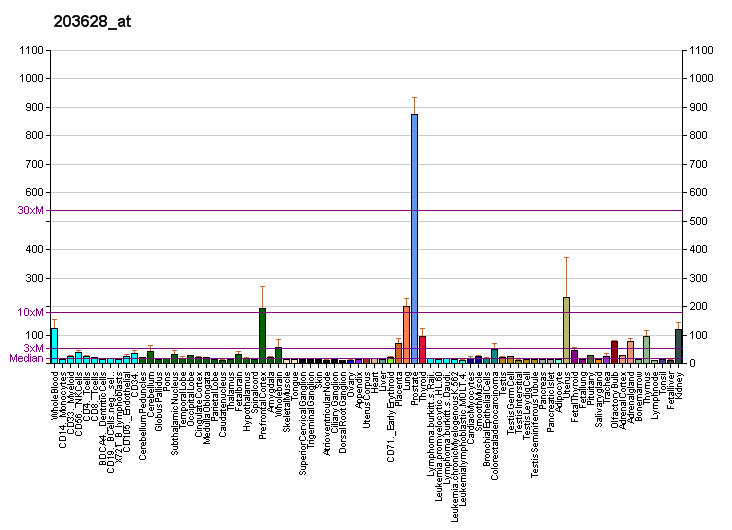
RNA expression pattern
Bgee	Human / Mouse (ortholog); Top expressed in: caput epididymis; corpus epididymis; renal medulla; tail of epididymis; saphenous vein; lactiferous duct; sural nerve; bronchial epithelial cell; retinal pigment epithelium; stromal cell of endometrium / Top expressed in: molar; transitional epithelium of urinary bladder; ciliary body; retinal pigment epithelium; conjunctival fornix; seminal vesicula; choroid plexus of fourth ventricle; Rostral migratory stream; vestibular membrane of cochlear duct; pineal gland; More reference expression data
BioGPS	More reference expression data
Gene ontology
Molecular function	transferase activity; nucleotide binding; protein kinase activity; insulin-like growth factor binding; insulin receptor binding; insulin binding; kinase activity; phosphatidylinositol 3-kinase binding; insulin-like growth factor-activated receptor activity; protein binding; identical protein binding; transmembrane receptor protein tyrosine kinase activity; insulin receptor substrate binding; protein tyrosine kinase activity; ATP binding; insulin-like growth factor I binding; insulin-activated receptor activity
Cellular component	integral component of membrane; membrane; intracellular membrane-bounded organelle; receptor complex; plasma membrane; integral component of plasma membrane; alphav-beta3 integrin-IGF-1-IGF1R complex; insulin receptor complex; axon
Biological process	insulin receptor signaling pathway; insulin-like growth factor receptor signaling pathway; phosphorylation; transmembrane receptor protein tyrosine kinase signaling pathway; positive regulation of cell migration; negative regulation of apoptotic process; protein tetramerization; positive regulation of DNA replication; protein phosphorylation; regulation of JNK cascade; immune response; positive regulation of cell population proliferation; peptidyl-tyrosine autophosphorylation; protein autophosphorylation; phosphatidylinositol 3-kinase signaling; phosphatidylinositol-mediated signaling; signal transduction; positive regulation of phosphatidylinositol 3-kinase signaling; glucose homeostasis; positive regulation of protein-containing complex disassembly; positive regulation of MAPK cascade; anatomical structure development; positive regulation of protein kinase B signaling; cellular response to glucose stimulus; dendritic spine maintenance; amyloid-beta clearance; positive regulation of cold-induced thermogenesis; cellular response to amyloid-beta
Sources:Amigo / QuickGO
Orthologs
Databases	NCBI: entry; OMA: entry
Species	Human	Mouse
Entrez	3480	16001
Ensembl	ENSG00000140443	ENSMUSG00000005533
UniProt	P08069	Q60751
RefSeq (mRNA)	NM_000875; NM_001291858; NM_152452	NM_010513
RefSeq (protein)	NP_000866; NP_001278787	NP_034643
Location (UCSC)	Chr 15: 98.65 – 98.96 Mb	Chr 7: 67.6 – 67.88 Mb
PubMed search
- Wikidata
View/Edit Human	View/Edit Mouse

The insulin-like growth factor 1 (IGF-1) receptor is a protein found on the surface of human cells. It is a transmembrane receptor that is activated by a hormone called insulin-like growth factor 1 (IGF-1) and by a related hormone called IGF-2. It belongs to the large class of tyrosine kinase receptors. This receptor mediates the effects of IGF-1, which is a polypeptide protein hormone similar in molecular structure to insulin. IGF-1 plays an important role in growth and continues to have anabolic effects in adults – meaning that it can induce hypertrophy of skeletal muscle and other target tissues. Mice lacking the IGF-1 receptor die late in development, and show a dramatic reduction in body mass. This testifies to the strong growth-promoting effect of this receptor.

== Structure ==
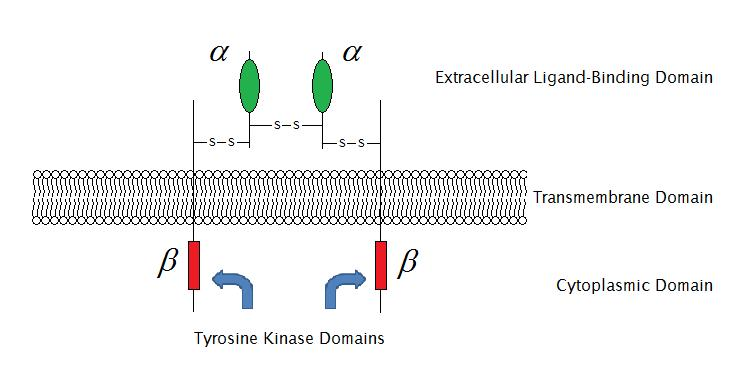
Schematic diagram of the IGF-1R structure

Two alpha subunits and two beta subunits make up the IGF-1 receptor. Both the α and β subunits are synthesized from a single mRNA precursor. The precursor is then glycosylated, proteolytically cleaved, and crosslinked by cysteine bonds to form a functional transmembrane αβ chain. The α chains are located extracellularly, while the β subunit spans the membrane and is responsible for intracellular signal transduction upon ligand stimulation. The mature IGF-1R has a molecular weight of approximately 320 kDa.^{citation?} The receptor is a member of a family which consists of the insulin receptor and the IGF-2R (and their respective ligands IGF-1 and IGF-2), along with several IGF-binding proteins.

IGF-1R and the insulin receptor both have a binding site for ATP, which is used to provide the phosphates for autophosphorylation. There is a 60% homology between IGF-1R and the insulin receptor. The structures of the autophosphorylation complexes of tyrosine residues 1165 and 1166 have been identified within crystals of the IGF1R kinase domain.

In response to ligand binding, the α chains induce the tyrosine autophosphorylation of the β chains. This event triggers a cascade of intracellular signaling that, while cell type-specific, often promotes cell survival and cell proliferation.

== Family members ==
Tyrosine kinase receptors, including the IGF-1 receptor, mediate their activity by causing the addition of a phosphate groups to particular tyrosines on certain proteins within a cell. This addition of phosphate induces what are called "cell signaling" cascades - and the usual result of activation of the IGF-1 receptor is survival and proliferation in mitosis-competent cells, and growth (hypertrophy) in tissues such as skeletal muscle and cardiac muscle.

== Function ==
=== Embryonic development ===
During embryonic development, the IGF-1R pathway is involved with the developing limb buds.

=== Lactation ===
The IGFR signalling pathway is of critical importance during normal development of mammary gland tissue during pregnancy and lactation. During pregnancy, there is intense proliferation of epithelial cells which form the duct and gland tissue. Following weaning, the cells undergo apoptosis and all the tissue is destroyed. Several growth factors and hormones are involved in this overall process, and IGF-1R is believed to have roles in the differentiation of the cells and a key role in inhibiting apoptosis until weaning is complete.

=== Insulin signaling ===
IGF-1 binds to at least two cell surface receptors: the IGF1 Receptor (IGFR), and the insulin receptor. The IGF-1 receptor seems to be the "physiologic" receptor—it binds IGF-1 at significantly higher affinity than it binds insulin. Like the insulin receptor, the IGF-1 receptor is a receptor tyrosine kinase—meaning it signals by causing the addition of a phosphate molecule on particular tyrosines. IGF-1 activates the insulin receptor at approximately 10% the potency of insulin. Part of this signaling may be via IGF1R/insulin receptor heterodimers (the reason for the confusion is that binding studies show that IGF-1 binds the insulin receptor 100-fold less well than insulin, yet that does not correlate with the actual potency of IGF-1 in vivo at inducing phosphorylation of the insulin receptor, and hypoglycemia).

=== Aging ===
Studies in female mice have shown that both supraoptic nucleus (SON) and paraventricular nucleus (PVN) lose approximately one-third of IGF-1R immunoreactive cells with normal aging. Also, old calorically restricted (CR) mice lost higher numbers of IGF-1R non-immunoreactive cells while maintaining similar counts of IGF-1R immunoreactive cells in comparison to old-Al mice. Consequently, old-CR mice show a higher percentage of IGF-1R immunoreactive cells, reflecting increased hypothalamic sensitivity to IGF-1 in comparison to normally aging mice.

=== Craniosynostosis ===
Mutations in IGF1R have been associated with craniosynostosis.

=== Body size ===
IGF-1R has been shown to have a significant effect on body size in small dog breeds. A "nonsynonymous SNP at chr3:44,706,389 that changes a highly conserved arginine at amino acid 204 to histidine" is associated with particularly tiny body size. "This mutation is predicted to prevent formation of several hydrogen bonds within the cysteine-rich domain of the receptor's ligand-binding extracellular subunit. Nine of 13 tiny dog breeds carry the mutation and many dogs are homozygous for it." Smaller individuals within several small and medium-sized breeds were shown to carry this mutation as well.

Mice carrying only one functional copy of IGF-1R are normal, but exhibit a ~15% decrease in body mass. IGF-1R has also been shown to regulate body size in dogs. A mutated version of this gene is found in a number of small dog breeds.

=== Gene inactivation/deletion ===
Deletion of the IGF-1 receptor gene in mice results in lethality during early embryonic development, and for this reason, IGF-1 insensitivity, unlike the case of growth hormone (GH) insensitivity (Laron syndrome), is not observed in the human population.

== Clinical significance ==
=== Cancer ===
The IGF-1R is implicated in several cancers, including breast, prostate, and lung cancers. In some instances its anti-apoptotic properties allow cancerous cells to resist the cytotoxic properties of chemotherapeutic drugs or radiotherapy. In breast cancer, where EGFR inhibitors such as erlotinib are being used to inhibit the EGFR signaling pathway, IGF-1R confers resistance by forming one half of a heterodimer (see the description of EGFR signal transduction in the erlotinib page), allowing EGFR signaling to resume in the presence of a suitable inhibitor. This process is referred to as crosstalk between EGFR and IGF-1R. It is further implicated in breast cancer by increasing the metastatic potential of the original tumour by conferring the ability to promote vascularisation.

Increased levels of the IGF-IR are expressed in the majority of primary and metastatic prostate cancer patient tumors. Evidence suggests that IGF-IR signaling is required for survival and growth when prostate cancer cells progress to androgen independence. In addition, when immortalized prostate cancer cells mimicking advanced disease are treated with the IGF-1R ligand, IGF-1, the cells become more motile. Members of the IGF receptor family and their ligands also seem to be involved in the carcinogenesis of mammary tumors of dogs. IGF1R is amplified in several cancer types based on analysis of TCGA data, and gene amplification could be one mechanism for overexpression of IGF1R in cancer.

Lung cancer cells stimulated using glucocorticoids were induced into a reversible dormancy state which was dependent on the IGF-1R and its accompanying survival signaling pathways.

== Inhibitors ==
Due to the similarity of the structures of IGF-1R and the insulin receptor (IR), especially in the regions of the ATP binding site and tyrosine kinase regions, synthesising selective inhibitors of IGF-1R is difficult. Prominent in current research are three main classes of inhibitor:

1. Tyrphostins such as AG538 and AG1024. These are in early pre-clinical testing. They are not thought to be ATP-competitive, although they are when used in EGFR as described in QSAR studies. These show some selectivity towards IGF-1R over IR.
2. Pyrrolo(2,3-d)-pyrimidine derivatives such as NVP-AEW541, invented by Novartis, which show far greater (100 fold) selectivity towards IGF-1R over IR.
3. Monoclonal antibodies are probably the most specific and promising therapeutic compounds. Teprotumumab is a novel therapy showing significant benefit for Thyroid Eye Disease.

== Interactions ==
Insulin-like growth factor 1 receptor has been shown to interact with:

- ARHGEF12,
- C-src tyrosine kinase,
- Cbl gene,
- EHD1,
- GRB10,
- IRS1,
- Mdm2,
- NEDD4,
- PIK3R3,
- PTPN11,
- RAS p21 protein activator 1,
- SHC1
- SOCS2,
- SOCS3, and
- YWHAE.

== Regulation ==
There is evidence to suggest that IGF1R is negatively regulated by the microRNA miR-7.

== See also ==
- Hypothalamic–pituitary–somatic axis
- Insulin receptor
- Linsitinib, an inhibitor of IGF-1R in clinical trials for cancer treatment
