= IBI311 =

Monoclonal antibody

IBI311 is a monoclonal antibody that targets IGF-1R and is being developed for thyroid eye disease. It is in a Phase III clinical trial as of 2023.
