= Boston's sign =

- Differential diagnosis: exophthalmic goiter

Boston's sign is the spasmodic lowering of the upper eyelid on downward rotation of the eye, indicating exophthalmic goiter.

Similar to von Graefe's sign, it is observed in people with Graves-Basedow disease, a type of hyperthyroidism. In this disease, the immune system attacks the thyroid gland and the soft tissues surrounding the eyes. As a result, the eyes are often pushed forward in the eye sockets, a condition known as exophthalmos.

== See also ==
- Graves orbitopathy
