= Graefe's Archive for Clinical and Experimental Ophthalmology =

Graefe's Archive for Clinical and Experimental Ophthalmology is an international, peer-reviewed scholoary journal dedicated to publishing original clinical and experimental studies in ophthalmology.

In 2024, Graefe's Archive for Clinical and Experimental Ophthalmology celebrated its 170th anniversary, having been founded in 1854 by Albrecht von Graefe. In its 170-year history, Antonia Joussen became the journal's first female editor-in-chief.
