= Orbital cellulitis =

Inflammation of eye tissues

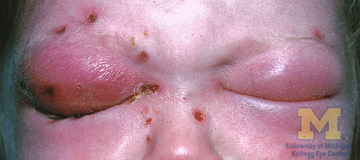
- Orbital Cellulitis
- Specialty: Ophthalmology

Orbital cellulitis is inflammation of eye tissues behind the orbital septum. It is most commonly caused by an acute spread of infection into the eye socket from either the adjacent sinuses or through the blood. It may also occur after trauma. When it affects the rear of the eye, it is known as retro-orbital cellulitis.

Without proper treatment, orbital cellulitis may lead to serious consequences, including permanent loss of vision or even death.

== Signs and symptoms ==
Orbital cellulitis commonly presents with painful eye movement, sudden vision loss, chemosis, bulging of the infected eye, and limited eye movement. Along with these symptoms, patients typically have redness and swelling of the eyelid, pain, discharge, inability to open the eye, occasional fever and lethargy.

=== Complications ===
Complications include hearing loss, blood infection, meningitis, cavernous sinus thrombosis, cerebral abscess, and blindness. It is possible that children experience more severe complications due to their immature immune system and because they have thinner orbital bones, which makes the infection easier to spread.

== Causes ==
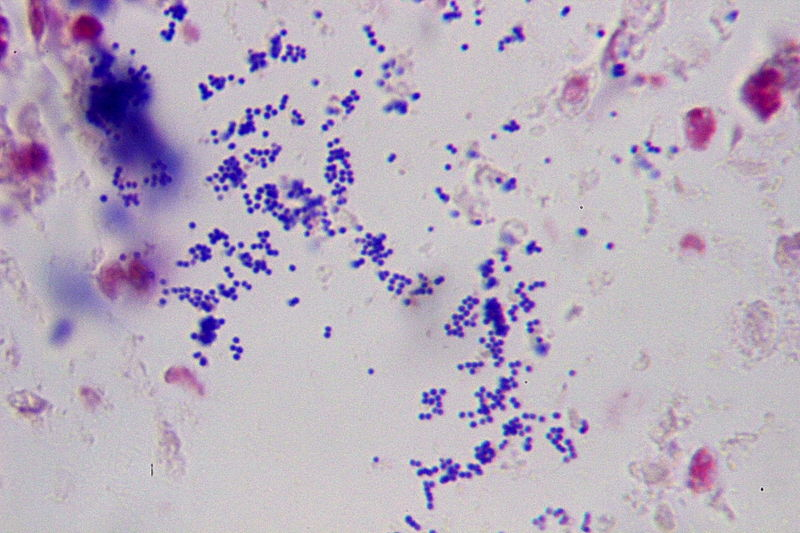
Gram-positive stain, possibly showing staphylococcus aureus, which is one of the primary causes of orbital cellulitis.

Orbital cellulitis occurs commonly from bacterial infection spread via the paranasal sinuses, usually from a previous sinus infection. Other ways in which orbital cellulitis may occur are from blood stream infections or from eyelid skin infections. Upper respiratory infection, sinus infection, trauma to the eye, ocular or periocular infection, and systemic infection all increase one's risk of orbital cellulitis.

Staphylococcus aureus, Haemophilus influenzae type b, Moraxella catarrhalis, Streptococcus pneumoniae, and beta-hemolytic streptococci are bacteria that can be responsible for orbital cellulitis.

- Staphylococcus aureus is a gram-positive bacterium, which is the most common cause of staphylococcal infections. Staphylococcus aureus infection can spread from the skin to the orbit. This organism is able to produce toxins which promotes its virulence, leading to the inflammatory response seen in orbital cellulitis. Staphylococcus infections are identified by a cluster arrangement on Gram stain. Staphylococcus aureus forms large yellow colonies when cultured (which is distinct from other Staph infections such as Staphylococcus epidermidis, which forms white colonies).
- Streptococcus pneumoniae is also a gram-positive bacterium responsible for orbital cellulitis due to its ability to infect the sinuses. Streptococcal bacteria can invade surrounding tissues, causing the inflammatory response seen in orbital cellulitis (similar to Staphylococcus aureus). Streptococcal infections are identified on culture by their formation of pairs or chains. Streptococcus pneumoniae produce green (alpha) hemolysis, or partial reduction of red blood cell hemoglobin.

== Risk factors ==
Risk factors for the development of orbital cellulitis include, but are not limited to:

- Recent upper respiratory illness
- Sinus infection
- Younger age
- Retained foreign bodies within the orbit
- Trauma
- Immunosuppression
- Systemic infection
- Dental infection

== Diagnosis ==
Early diagnosis of orbital cellulitis is urgent, and it involves a complete and thorough physical examination. Common presenting signs include: a protruding eye (proptosis), eyelid edema (swelling), eye pain, vision loss, inability to move the eye completely (ophthalmoplegia), and fever. It is important to correlate physical findings with patient history and reported symptoms.

CT scan and MRI of the orbits are two imaging modalities that are commonly used to aid in the diagnosis and monitoring of orbital cellulitis, as they can provide detailed images that can show the extent of inflammation along with possible abscess location, size, and involvement of surrounding structures. Ultrasound has also been used as an imaging modality in the past, but it cannot provide the same level of detail as CT or MRI.

Blood cultures, electrolytes, and a complete blood count (CBC) with differential showing elevated white blood cell count is a useful laboratory test that may aid in diagnosis.

=== Differential Diagnosis ===
A variety of pathologies and diseases can present similarly to orbital cellulitis, including:

- Inflammatory causes (thyroid eye disease, idiopathic orbital inflammatory syndrome, sarcoidosis, granulomatosis with polyangiitis)
- Infectious causes (subperiosteal abscess)
- Neoplastic, benign and malignant (dermoid cyst, capillary hemangioma, rhabdomyosarcoma, optic nerve glioma, lymphangioma, neurofibroma, leukemia)
- Trauma (orbital fracture, retrobulbar hemorrhage, orbital foreign body, carotid cavernous fistula)
- Malformation (congenital, vascular)

== Treatment ==
Immediate treatment is very important, and it typically involves intravenous (IV) antibiotics in the hospital and frequent observation (every 4–6 hours). Several lab tests should be ordered, including a complete blood count, differential, and blood culture.

- Antibiotic therapy – Since orbital cellulitis is commonly caused by Staphylococcus and Streptococcus species, both penicillins and cephalosporins are typically the best choices for IV antibiotics. However, due to the increasing rise of MRSA (methicillin-resistant Staphylococcus aureus) orbital cellulitis can also be treated with Vancomycin, Clindamycin, or Doxycycline. If improvement is noted after 48 hours of IV antibiotics, healthcare professionals can then consider switching a patient to oral antibiotics (which must be used for 2–3 weeks).
- Surgical intervention – An abscess can threaten the vision or neurological status of a patient with orbital cellulitis, therefore sometimes surgical intervention is necessary. Surgery typically requires drainage of the sinuses and if a subperiosteal abscess is present in the medial orbit, drainage can be performed endoscopically. Post-operatively, patients must follow up regularly with their surgeon and remain under close observation.
- Corticosteroids - Complications of orbital cellulitis may arise as a result of swelling from the infection. Because the orbit is a small space, increasing the pressure inside can harm the eye. Steroids are drugs that are used to reduce swelling caused by various illnesses, but they can also weaken the immune system's ability to fight the infection. There is inadequate evidence to draw judgments about the use of steroids in the treatment of orbital cellulitis. More research is needed to inform decision making.

== Prognosis ==
Although orbital cellulitis is considered an ophthalmic emergency, the prognosis is good if prompt medical treatment is received.

=== Death and blindness rates without treatment ===
Bacterial infections of the orbit have long been associated with a risk of devastating outcomes and intracranial spread.

The natural course of the disease, as documented by Gamble (1933), in the pre-antibiotic era, resulted in death in 17% of patients and permanent blindness in 20%.

== Epidemiology ==
Orbital cellulitis is an uncommon medical condition, with the reported rates being much higher among the pediatric population compared to the adult population. One study reported that children are approximately 16 times more likely to suffer from orbital cellulitis compared to adults. It is twice as common among male children compared to female children. Some studies reported that orbital cellulitis follows a seasonal pattern, with the highest rates occurring during the fall and winter, which coincides with the higher rates of sinus infection during the colder months.
