= Dalrymple's sign =

Medical sign

Dalrymple's sign is a widened palpebral (eyelid) opening, or eyelid spasm, seen in thyrotoxicosis (as seen in Graves' disease, exophthalmic goitre and other hyperthyroid conditions), causing abnormal wideness of the palpebral fissure. As a result of the retraction of the upper eyelid, the white of the sclera is visible at the upper margin of the cornea in direct outward stare. It is named after British ophthalmologist, John Dalrymple (1803–1852).

Other eye signs described within the symptomology of Graves' disease are Stellwag's sign (rare blinking), Rosenbach's sign (tremor of the eyelids), and Jelink's sign (hyperpigmentation of the eyelid).

== See also ==
- Graves' ophthalmopathy
