= Paul Julius Möbius =

German neurologist (1853–1907)

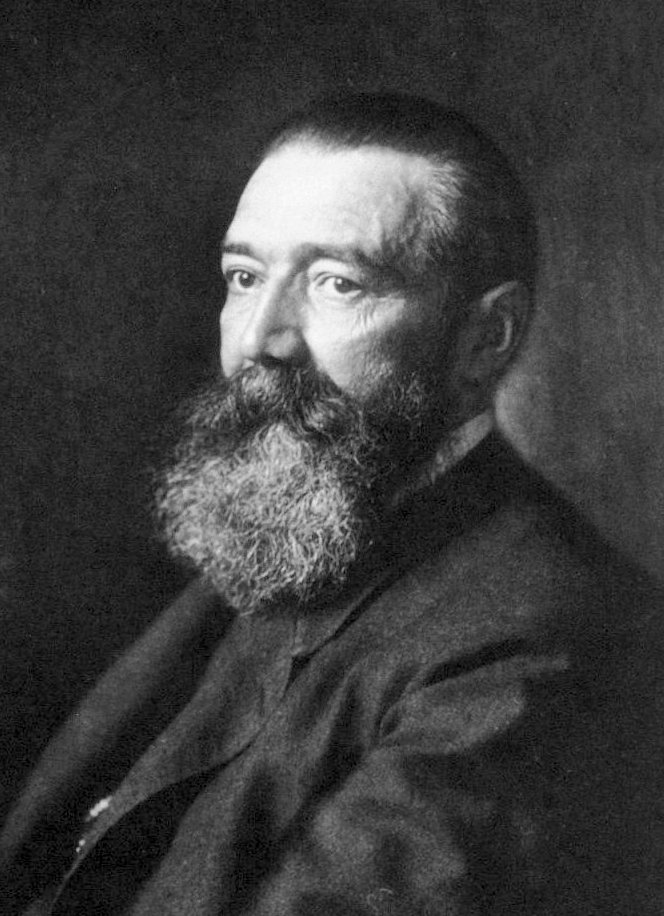
- Möbius c. 1900
- Born: 24 January 1853; Leipzig, Kingdom of Saxony
- Died: 8 January 1907 (aged 53); Leipzig, German Empire
- Education: University of Leipzig, University of Jena, University of Marburg
- Known for: Contributions to neurology, psychiatry, Möbius syndrome
- Scientific career
- Fields: Neurology, Psychiatry
- Workplaces: University of Leipzig

Paul Julius Möbius (German: [ˈmøːbi̯ʊs]; 24 January 1853 – 8 January 1907) was a German neurologist born in Leipzig. His grandfather was the German mathematician and theoretical astronomer August Ferdinand Möbius (1790–1868).

Prior to entering the medical field in 1873, he studied philosophy and theology at the Universities of Leipzig, Jena and Marburg. After earning his medical doctorate in 1876, he enlisted in the army, attaining the rank of Oberstabsarzt (senior staff surgeon). After leaving the army, he returned to Leipzig, where he opened a private practice and worked as an assistant to neurologist Adolph Strümpell (1853–1925) at the university policlinic. In 1883 he obtained his habilitation for neurology.

He was a prolific writer and is well known for publications in the fields of neurophysiology and endocrinology. Among his writings in psychiatry were psychopathological studies of Goethe, Rousseau, Schopenhauer and Nietzsche. He was also an editor of Schmidt's Jahrbücher der in- und ausländischen gesammten Medizin.

Möbius made pioneer contributions towards the understanding of how some mental illnesses occur. He is credited for providing a distinction between exogenous and endogenous nerve disorders, and introduced ideas on the etiology of hysteria.

== Medical terms ==
His name is associated with Möbius syndrome, a disease he identified as "nuclear atrophy". This is a rare type of palsy associated with paralysis of the cranial nerves VI and VII. This results in the patient having a masklike facial expression along with many other abnormalities such as drooling, crossed eyes, speech difficulties and problems swallowing. Other eponyms associated with Möbius are:

- Leyden–Möbius syndrome – muscular dystrophy in the pelvic region; named along with neurologist Ernst Viktor von Leyden (1832–1910)
- Möbius sign – weakness of eye convergence; a situation when one eye converges and the other diverges when looking at the tip of one's nose, a condition associated with Graves' disease. Möbius postulated that hypersecretion of the thyroid was a link to goiters.

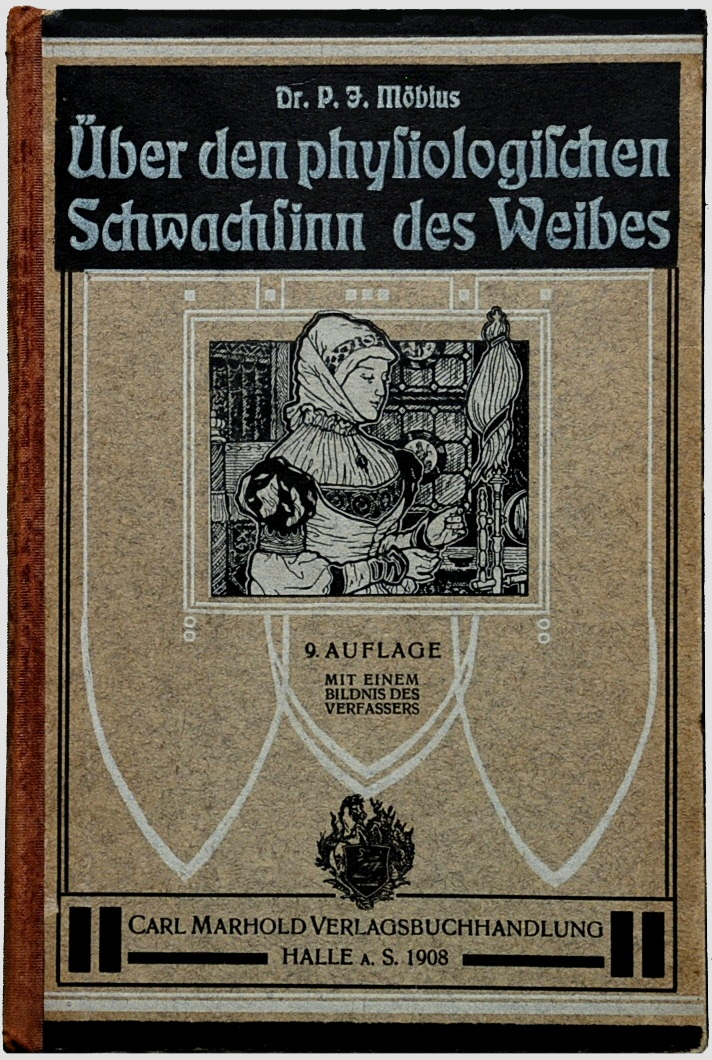
Front cover of "Über den physiologischen Schwachsinn des Weibes" (9th edition, 1908)

== Work ==
Today his most historically significant contribution to science is his work on the psychogenics of psychiatric and mental illnesses, such as hysteria. For the first time in the German-speaking world he postulated psychological causes of disease. For this reason and because of his convincing arguments for the therapeutical effects of electrotherapy, Sigmund Freud referred to Möbius as one of the fathers of psychotherapy.

A further important contribution is to have given his friend, the psychiatrist Emil Kraepelin (1856-1926), important ideas to the differentiation and systematisation of mental illness. Moebius had only made one, on the causes of diseases based classification of nervous and mental diseases. Its subdivision in endogenous and exogenous errors has long been preserved and was leading the way for the psychiatry and neurology of the 20th century. Endogenous errors established in the nervous system itself, manifested as degeneration. In the long term Möbius thus paved to way for eugenics and the crimes of German Nazism against the psychiatrically and neurologically diseased. Also, Möbius syndrome bears his name, which he first described in 1888; and he pointed the way to understanding the cause of the endocrinological disorder Graves' disease.

Moebius won a still dubious fame by his pamphlet "On the Physiological Idiocy of Women" (Halle: Marhold 1900). He received the greatest contemporary recognition for carving out his own territory with this work. The key message of the work not only postulated that "idiocy of woman", but also tried to impose this on already dubious methods. Moebius received plaudits for this piece, but also criticism, such as The Anti-feminists (1902) by Hedwig Dohm (1831–1919). In further response to Moebius were written such as Women and Intellectualism by Oda Olberg in 1903 and Feminism and Science by Johanna Elberskirchen in 1902. Elberskirchen said: "The truth is that when scholars make opinions concerning females, they are too much man (Mann) and too little or not at all scientifically reasoning human (Mensch)." (Elberskirchen 1902 p. 4) In other writings (such as Sex and Head Size) Moebius tried to support his theses with comments that showed his misunderstanding of brain anatomy and brain physiology. "On the Physiological Idiocy of Women" went through eight editions during his lifetime. In the later editions Moebius published letters from women and men which he had received for and against the book. These letters accounted for almost half of the book at the end.

In the play Weiningers Nacht by Joshua Sobol, Moebius appears as a follower of the philosopher Otto Weininger (1880–1903), whom he accused of plagiarism.

== Partial bibliography ==
- Grundriss des deutschen Militärsanitätswesens. Leipzig, 1878 – Outline of German military medical service.
- Über hereditäre Nervenkrankheiten. in Richard von Volkmann's Sammlung klinischer Vorträge. Leipzig, 1879 – On hereditary nervous diseases.
- Das Nervensystem des Menschen. Leipzig, 1880 – The nervous system of humans.
- Die Nervosität. Leipzig, 1882; third edition, 1906 – Nervousness.
- Über angeborene Facialis-Abducenslähmung. Münchener mediznische Wochenschrift, 1888 – On congenital facial paralysis of the abducens nerve.
- Die Basedowsche Krankheit. In Hermann Nothnagel's Handbuch der speciellen Pathologie und Therapie. Volume 12; Vienna – 1894; second edition, 1903 – On Graves' disease.
- Über den physiologischen Schwachsinn des Weibes. Slg. Abh. Nervenkrkh. Volume 3, H. 3. Halle, 1900; ninth edition, 1908 – On the physiological idiocy of women.
- Beiträge zur Lehre von den Geschlechtsunterschieden. Halle, 1903–1904 – Contributions to the theory of gender differences.
- Im Grenzlande. Aufsätze über Sachen des Glaubens. Leipzig, 1905 – In the Borderlands; Essays on matters of faith.
