= Cavernous sinus thrombosis =

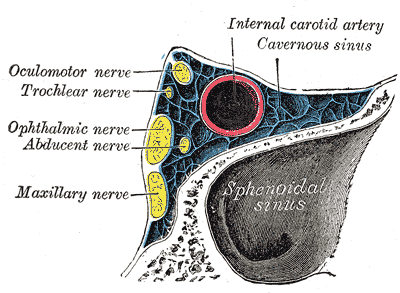
- Oblique section through the cavernous sinus.
- Specialty: Neurology

Cavernous sinus thrombosis (CST) is the formation of a blood clot within the cavernous sinus, a cavity at the base of the brain which drains deoxygenated blood from the brain back to the heart. This is a rare disorder and can be of two types–septic cavernous thrombosis and aseptic cavernous thrombosis. The most common form is septic cavernous sinus thrombosis. The cause is usually from a spreading infection in the nose, sinuses, ears, or teeth. Staphylococcus aureus and Streptococcus are often the associated bacteria.

Cavernous sinus thrombosis symptoms include: decrease or loss of vision, chemosis, exophthalmos (bulging eyes), headaches, and paralysis of the cranial nerves which course through the cavernous sinus. This infection is life-threatening and requires immediate treatment, which usually includes antibiotics and sometimes surgical drainage. Aseptic cavernous sinus thrombosis is usually associated with trauma, dehydration, anemia, and other disorders.

== Signs and symptoms ==
The clinical presentation of CST can be varied. Both acute, fulminant disease, and indolent, subacute presentations have been reported in the literature. The most common signs of CST are related to anatomical structures affected within the cavernous sinus, notably cranial nerves III-VI, as well as symptoms resulting from impaired venous drainage from the orbit and eye. Classic presentations are abrupt onset of unilateral periorbital edema, headache, photophobia, and bulging of the eye (exophthalmos).

Other common signs and symptoms include:

Ptosis, chemosis, cranial nerve palsies (III, IV, V, VI). Sixth nerve palsy is the most common. Sensory deficits of the ophthalmic and maxillary branch of the fifth nerve are common. Periorbital sensory loss and impaired corneal reflex may be noted. Papilledema, retinal hemorrhages, and decreased visual acuity and blindness may occur from venous congestion within the retina. Fever, tachycardia and sepsis may be present. Headache with nuchal rigidity (neck stiffness) may occur. One or both pupils may be dilated and sluggishly reactive. Infection can spread to contralateral cavernous sinus within 24–48 hours of initial presentation.

== Cause ==
Septic CST most commonly results from contiguous spread of infection from a nasal furuncle (50%), sphenoidal or ethmoidal sinuses (30%) and dental infections (10%). Less common primary sites of infection include tonsils, soft palate, middle ear, or orbit (orbital cellulitis). The highly anastomotic venous system of the paranasal sinuses allows retrograde spread of infection to the cavernous sinus via the superior and inferior ophthalmic veins. It was previously thought that veins in the area were valveless and that this was the major cause of the retrograde spread, but studies have since shown that the ophthalmic and facial veins are not valveless.

Staphylococcus aureus is the most common infectious microbe, found in 70% of the cases. Streptococcus is the second leading cause. Gram-negative rods and anaerobes may also lead to cavernous sinus thrombosis. Rarely, Aspergillus fumigatus and mucormycosis cause CST.

Aseptic cavernous sinus thrombosis is much less common and is usually associated with other disorders including trauma, circulatory problems, nasopharynx cancers and other tumors of the skull base, dehydration, and anemia.

== Diagnosis ==
The diagnosis of cavernous sinus thrombosis is made clinically, with imaging studies to confirm the clinical impression. Proptosis, ptosis, chemosis, and cranial nerve palsy beginning in one eye and progressing to the other eye establish the diagnosis. Cavernous sinus thrombosis is a clinical diagnosis with laboratory tests and imaging studies confirming the clinical impression.

=== Laboratory tests ===
CBC, ESR, blood cultures and sinus cultures help establish and identify an infectious primary source. Lumbar puncture is necessary to rule out meningitis.

=== Imaging studies ===
Sinus films are helpful in the diagnosis of sphenoid sinusitis. Opacification, sclerosis, and air-fluid levels are typical findings. Contrast-enhanced CT scan may reveal underlying sinusitis, thickening of the superior ophthalmic vein, and irregular filling defects within the cavernous sinus; however, findings may be normal early in the disease course. An MRI using flow parameters and an MR venogram are more sensitive than a CT scan and are the imaging studies of choice to diagnose cavernous sinus thrombosis. Findings may include deformity of the internal carotid artery within the cavernous sinus, and an obvious signal hyperintensity within thrombosed vascular sinuses on all pulse sequences. Cerebral angiography can be performed, but it is invasive and not very sensitive. Orbital venography is difficult to perform, but it is excellent in diagnosing occlusion of the cavernous sinus.

=== Differential diagnosis ===
- Orbital cellulitis
- Internal carotid artery aneurysm
- Stroke
- Migraine headache
- Allergic blepharitis
- Thyroid exophthalmos
- Brain tumor
- Meningitis
- Mucormycosis
- Trauma

== Treatment ==
Recognizing the primary source of infection (i.e., facial cellulitis, middle ear, and sinus infections) and treating the primary source expeditiously is the best way to prevent cavernous sinus thrombosis.

=== Antibiotics ===
Broad-spectrum intravenous antibiotics are used until a definite pathogen is found.

1. Nafcillin 1.5 g IV q4h
2. Cefotaxime 1.5 to 2 g IV q4h
3. Metronidazole 15 mg/kg load followed by 7.5 mg/kg IV q6h

Vancomycin may be substituted for nafcillin if significant concern exists for infection by methicillin-resistant Staphylococcus aureus or resistant Streptococcus pneumoniae. Appropriate therapy should take into account the primary source of infection as well as possible associated complications such as brain abscess, meningitis, or subdural empyema.

People with CST are usually treated with prolonged courses (3–4 weeks) of IV antibiotics. If there is evidence of complications such as intracranial suppuration, 6–8 weeks of total therapy may be warranted.

All patients should be monitored for signs of complicated infection, continued sepsis, or septic emboli while antibiotic therapy is being administered.

=== Heparin ===
Anticoagulation with heparin is controversial. Retrospective studies show conflicting data. This decision should be made with subspecialty consultation. One systematic review concluded that anticoagulation treatment appeared safe and was associated with a potentially important reduction in the risk of death or dependency.

=== Steroids ===
Steroid therapy is also controversial in many cases of CST. However, corticosteroids are absolutely indicated in cases of pituitary insufficiency. Corticosteroid use may have a critical role in patients with Addisonian crisis secondary to ischemia or necrosis of the pituitary that complicates CST.

== Prognosis ==
Cavernous sinus thrombosis has a mortality rate of less than 20% in areas with access to antibiotics. Before antibiotics were available, the mortality was 80–100%. Morbidity rates also dropped from 70% to 22% due to earlier diagnosis and treatment.
