= Mir-7 microRNA precursor =

Precursor microRNA family

mir-7 microRNA precursor
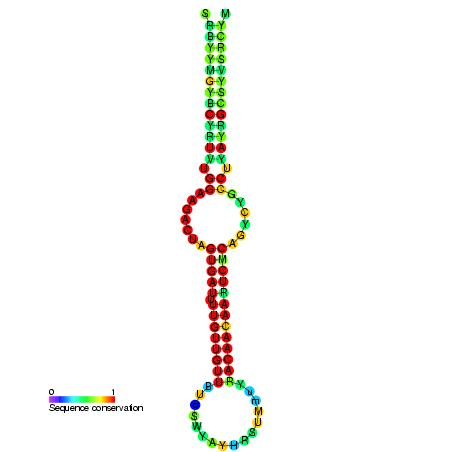
- Predicted secondary structure and sequence conservation of mir-7

Identifiers
- Symbol: mir-7
- Rfam: RF00053
- miRBase: MI0000263
- miRBase family: MIPF0000022

Other data
- RNA type: Gene; miRNA
- Domain(s): Eukaryota
- GO: GO:0035195 GO:0035068
- SO: SO:0001244
- PDB structures: PDBe

This family represents the microRNA (miRNA) precursor mir-7. This miRNA has been predicted or experimentally confirmed in a wide range of species. miRNAs are transcribed as ~70 nucleotide precursors (modelled here) and subsequently processed by the Dicer enzyme to give a ~22 nucleotide product. In this case the mature sequence comes from the 5' arm of the precursor. The extents of the hairpin precursors are not generally known and are estimated based on hairpin prediction. The involvement of Dicer in miRNA processing suggests a relationship with the phenomenon of RNA interference.

Mature miRNA-7 is derived from three microRNA precursors in the human genome, miR-7-1, miR-7-2 and miR-7-3. miRNAs are numbered based on the sequence of the mature RNA.

miR-7 is directly regulated by the transcription factor HoxD10.

miRNAs are thought to have regulatory roles through complementarity to mRNA. miR-7 is essential for the maintenance of regulatory stability under conditions of environmental flux. It plays an important role in controlling mRNA expression. The miR-7 gene is found in most sequenced Urbilateria species, and the sequence of its mature miRNA product is perfectly conserved from annelids to humans, indicating a strong functional conservation.

== Targets of miR-7 ==
Bioinformatic predictions suggest that the human EGFR mRNA 3'-untranslated region contains three microRNA-7 (miR-7) target sites, which are not conserved across mammals. In Drosophila photoreceptor cells, miR-7 controls epidermal growth factor receptor (EGFR) signaling and promotes photoreceptor differentiation. Among other targets of miR-7 are insulin-like growth factor 1 receptor (IGF1R) and PIK3CD, E(spl) gene family and Pak1 (cancer cells). c-Fos is also a target of miR-7b in mice. Pax6 translation in the lateral wall of the subventricular zone of developed mice is post-transcriptionally regulated by miRNA-7a mediated gene silencing, which is necessary to control the rate of dopaminergic neuron production in the olfactory bulb.

== Clinical relevance ==
Multiple roles and targets of miR-7 as well as its expression pattern were linked to regulatory mechanisms and pathogenesis in glioblastoma, breast cancer and other types of cancers, as well as in schizophrenia and visual abnormalities. Inhibition of the motility, invasiveness, anchorage-independent growth, and tumorigenic potential of highly invasive breast cancer cells through the introduction of miR-7 suggests a strong therapeutic potential of miR-7.
