= Infiltrative ophthalmopathy =

- Specialty: Ophthalmology

Infiltrative ophthalmopathy is found in 5-10% of patients with Graves disease and resembles exophthalmos, except that the blurry or double vision is acquired because of weakness in the ocular muscles of the eye. In addition, there is no known correlation with the patient's thyroid levels. Exophthalmos associated with Grave's disease disappears when the thyrotoxicosis is corrected. Infiltrative ophthalmopathy at times may not be cured. Treatments consist of high dose glucocorticoids and low dose radiotherapy. The current hypothesis is that infiltrative ophthalmopathy may be autoimmune in nature targeting retrobulbar tissue. Smoking may also have a causative effect.
