= Möbius sign =

- Differential diagnosis: Graves disease

Möbius sign is a clinical sign in which there is an inability to maintain convergence of the eyes. It is found in patients with Graves' disease.

The sign is named after Paul Julius Möbius.
