= Teprotumumab =

Drug for thyroid eye disease

Monoclonal antibody
- Type: Whole antibody
- Source: Human
- Target: IGF-1R

Clinical data
- Trade names: Tepezza
- Other names: Teprotumumab-trbw, AMG 632, HZN-001, RV 001, RG-1507, R1507, RO4858696
- AHFS/Drugs.com: Monograph
- MedlinePlus: a620025
- License data: US DailyMed: Teprotumumab
- Routes of administration: Intravenous
- ATC code: L04AG13 (WHO)

Legal status
- Legal status: AU: S4 (Prescription only); CA: ℞-only / Schedule D; US: ℞-only; EU: Rx-only

Identifiers
- CAS Number: 1036734-93-6
- DrugBank: DB06343
- ChemSpider: none
- UNII: Y64GQ0KC0A
- KEGG: D09680
- ChEMBL: ChEMBL1743079
- ECHA InfoCard: 100.081.384

Chemical and physical data
- Formula: C_{6476}H_{10012}N_{1748}O_{2000}S_{40}
- Molar mass: 145639.97 g·mol^{−1}

Teprotumumab, sold under the brand name Tepezza, is a medication used to treat thyroid eye disease (Graves' eye disease), a rare condition where the muscles and fatty tissues behind the eye become inflamed, causing the eyes to bulge outwards. It is a human monoclonal antibody developed by Genmab and Roche for tumor treatment but was later developed by River Vision Development Corporation and Horizon Therapeutics to be used for ophthalmic uses. It binds to IGF-1R.

The most common side effects are muscle spasm, nausea, hair loss, diarrhea, fatigue, high blood sugar, hearing loss, dry skin, altered sense of taste, and headache. Teprotumumab should not be used if pregnant.

Teprotumumab was approved for medical use in the United States in January 2020. The US Food and Drug Administration (FDA) considers it to be a first-in-class medication.

== Medical use ==
Teprotumumab is indicated for the treatment of thyroid eye disease.

== History ==
In a multi-center, randomized trial in participants with active Graves' ophthalmopathy, teprotumumab was more effective than placebo. In February 2019, Horizon announced results from a Phase III confirmatory trial evaluating teprotumumab for the treatment of active thyroid eye disease (TED). The study met its primary endpoint, showing more participants treated with teprotumumab compared with placebo had a meaningful improvement in proptosis, or bulging of the eye: 82.9% of teprotumumab participants compared to 9.5% of placebo participants achieved the primary endpoint of a 2 mm or more reduction in proptosis (p<0.001). Proptosis is the main cause of morbidity in TED. All secondary endpoints were also met and the safety profile was consistent with the Phase II study of teprotumumab in TED. In July 2019, Horizon submitted a biologics license application to the US Food and Drug Administration (FDA) for teprotumumab for the treatment of active thyroid eye disease.

Teprotumumab was first investigated for the treatment of solid and hematologic tumors, including breast cancer, Hodgkin's and non-Hodgkin's lymphoma, non-small cell lung cancer, and sarcoma.

Teprotumumab-trbw was approved based on the results of two clinical trials (Trial 1/ NCT01868997 and Trial 2/ NCT03298867) of 170 subjects with active TED who were randomized to either receive teprotumumab-trbw or a placebo. Of the subjects who were administered Tepezza, 71% in study 1 and 83% in study 2 demonstrated a greater than 2 mm reduction in proptosis (eye protrusion) as compared to 20% and 10% of subjects who received placebo, respectively. The trials were conducted at 28 sites in Europe and United States. Teprotumumab-trbw was approved for use in the United States in January 2020, for the treatment of adults with thyroid eye disease. The FDA granted the application for teprotumumab-trbw fast-track, breakthrough therapy, priority review, and orphan drug designations. The FDA granted the approval of Tepezza to Horizon Therapeutics Ireland DAC.

== Society and culture ==
=== Legal status ===
In April 2025, the Committee for Medicinal Products for Human Use (CHMP) of the European Medicines Agency adopted a positive opinion, recommending the granting of a marketing authorization for the medicinal product Tepezza, intended for the treatment of adults with moderate to severe thyroid eye disease. The applicant for this medicinal product is Amgen Europe B.V. Teprotumumab was authorized for medical use in the European Union in June 2025.

The CHMP's opinion is based on data from three randomized, placebo-controlled trials in a total of 225 participants with active thyroid eye disease, and one trial in 62 participants with chronic thyroid eye disease. After 24 weeks, participants treated with teprotumumab experienced a significant reduction (-2 to -2.3 mm) in protrusion of the eyeball from the eye socket (proptosis) and in the clinical activity score, a standard tool to evaluate inflammatory signs and symptoms of thyroid eye disease, compared to participants treated with placebo. The reduction in proptosis was smaller (-1.5mm) in participants with chronic thyroid eye disease.
