= Von Graefe knife =

Surgical tool

The von Graefe knife was a tool used to make corneal incisions in cataract surgery. Use of the knife demanded a high level of skill and mastery, and was eventually supplanted by modifications of cataract surgery through the Kelman phacoemulsification technique that emphasized a small incision.

== History ==
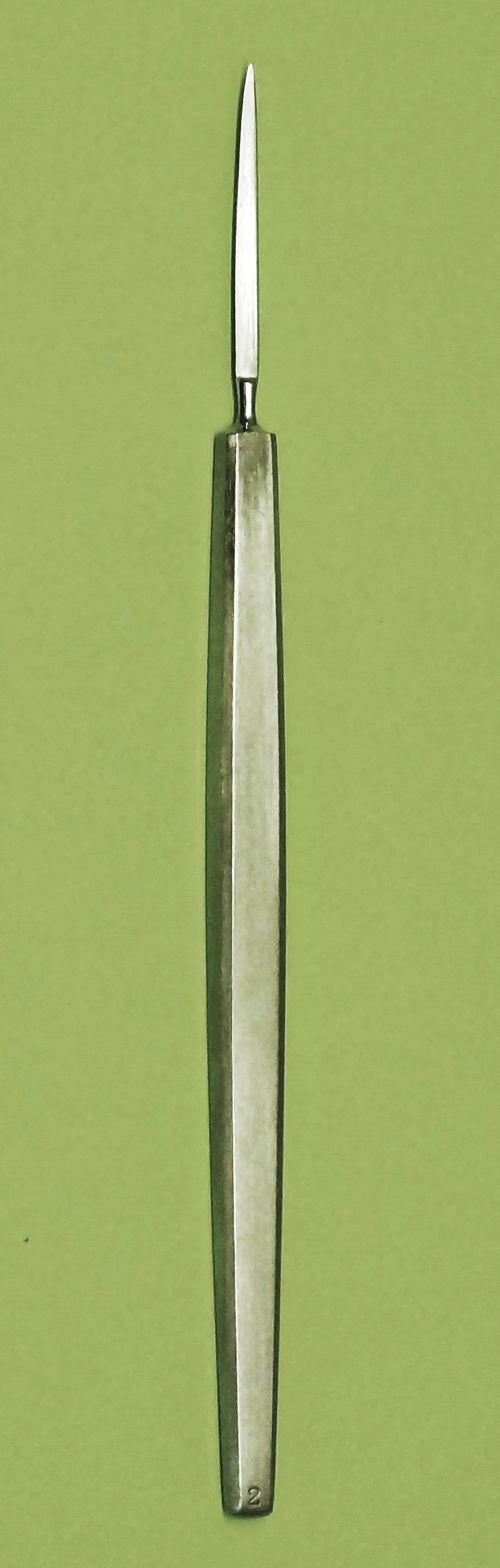

Until the acceptability of the keratome-and-scissors method after the early 1940s, an essential part of cataract surgery was mastery of the von Graefe knife. With increased popularity of sutures—especially pre-placed scleral groove (McLean) sutures, it became difficult for the occasional surgeon to develop the skill required to make an acceptable von Graefe incision. If the surgeon was not ambidextrous, the use of the von Graefe knife might be even more difficult with the non-dominant hand. With his right hand, he introduced the knife into the anterior chamber of the right eye at 9. He would then perforate the limbal area at 3. An upward sweep was then made to complete the incision. Most frequently, there was no conjunctival flap. However, some especially skilled eye surgeons formed a conjunctival flap as they were completing the upward sweep. Normally, the ambidextrous von Graefe surgeon would switch to his left hand so that he could enter the left eye at 3 and exit at 9. If he used his dominant right hand for the left eye, the nose became an impediment when he attempted to enter the eye at 9 and attempted to counter perforate at 3. Often, poor results could have been prevented by the use of post-placed sutures. Unfortunately, in the early years of cataract surgery, suitable sutures and needles were not in the armamentarium of many cataract surgeons.

In the 1980s, with the ever-increasing popularity of the Kelman phacoemulsification technique that emphasized a small incision and extra-capsular cataract extraction (ECCE), the keratome-and-scissors, large incision surgery technique combined with intracapsular cataract extraction (ICCE) became obsolete, although the use of the von Graefe knife still continued in India. Sutures had limited if any use in routine cataract surgery for the high-volume most experienced and skilled eye surgeons in the world. Their experience and skill resulted in the outstanding rural cataract camps so common in India. Formally trained Indian ophthalmologists were and are among the deftest in the use of the von Graefe knife. Ultraviolet-rich India with its vast rural and underclass population afflicted with nutritional eye diseases combined with a multitude of public health problems was and still is the "Land of Eye Disease and Eye Surgery". Few Western ophthalmologists have the daily volume of eye pathology and eye surgery that faces their Indian counterparts.

It is possible for an eye to recover from an intracapsular cataract operation that entailed a 170 to 180 degree superior corneal or limbal incision without the closure of the incisional wound by means of sutures. Recovery was significantly dependent on the quality of a well-made von Graefe knife incision with a well-honed and well-maintained knife. Unlike keratome-and-scissors incision, a well-performed von Graefe knife maneuver produced a corneal or limbal incision with well-opposed edges that resulted in rapid healing and a scar that was almost invisible to the naked eye. However, a poorly made von Graefe knife incision could lead to horrendous disasters.

== See also ==
- Instruments used in general surgery
