= Stellwag's sign =

Medical sign in the eyes

- Differential diagnosis: Graves orbitopathy

Stellwag's sign is a sign of infrequent or incomplete blinking associated with exophthalmos or Graves orbitopathy. It is accompanied by Dalrymple's sign, which is a retraction of the upper eyelids resulting in an apparent widening of the palpebral opening.

Stellwag's sign is named after Austrian ophthalmologist Karl Stellwag von Carion.
