= Oda Olberg =

Journalist and feminist (1872–1955)

- Born: 2 October 1872; Bremerhaven, Germany
- Died: 11 April 1955 (aged 82); Buenos Aires, Argentina
- Other name: Oda Olberg-Lerda
- Occupations: journalist, writer
- Known for: socialist and feminist writings
- Spouse: Giovanni Lerda

Oda Olberg (1872 – 1955), also known as Oda Olberg-Lerda, was a German-born journalist, socialist and feminist. Her career was cut short by the rise of Fascism in Italy and Germany.

== Life ==
Oda Olberg was born in Bremerhaven on 2 October 1872, the daughter of a German naval officer. In 1896 she moved to Italy, and in 1897 married the Italian socialist Giovanni Lerda. She became foreign affairs editor for Avanti!, the newspaper of the Italian Socialist Party, and in 1899 the official foreign correspondent for the Arbeiter-Zeitung.

A feminist, in 1902 Olberg published Women and Intellectualism as a rejoinder to 'On the Physiological Feeblemindedess of Woman' by Paul Julius Möbius. Olberg argued that 'intellectual workers' bore eugenic responsibility for the 'race'. Though neither men nor women should make successive generations pay by 'excessive' mental application, mothering should ideally be imbued with intellectual elements. In favourable environmental circumstances this would have 'positive racial hygienist value'.

Living in Rome in the early 1920s, Olberg and Lerda witnessed Fascist violence. In 1923 she published a study of Italian Fascism. The pair faced increasing threats of violence from the mid-1920s, and Lerda died in 1927. Olberg left Italy to join her son Edgardo in Argentina, but returned to Vienna in 1928, where she worked as correspondent for the Vienna Arbeiter-Zeitung (Vienna). She wrote on the effects of the economic depression, and published a short study of Nazism in 1932.

After the socialist failure to resist Nazism in the 1934 Austrian Civil War, Olberg went into exile, rejoining her son Edgardo in Buenos Aires. She wrote in Spanish for several Argentinean journals, including Critica, as well as the German-language Argentinisches Tageblatt. In 1937 she helped found the anti-Nazi exile organization Das Andere Deutschland. However, her health declined due to a cardiac condition. Though she continued to write, she suffered censorship under Juan Perón. She died in Buenos Aires on 11 April 1955.

== Works ==
- Das Elend in der Hausindustrie der Konfektion [Poverty among Home Workers in Clothes Making] . 1896.
- Das Weib und der Intellektualismus [Women and Intellectualism]. 1902.
- Der Fascismus in Italien [Fascism in Italy]. 1923.
- Die Entartung in ihrer Kulturbedingtheit: Bemerkungen und Anregungen [Degeneracy in Its Relation to Culture: Remarks and Suggestions]. 1926.
- Nationalsozialismus [National Socialism]. 1932.
- Der Mensch, sein eigener Feind: Betrachtungen über Gerechtigkeit [Humanity, Its Own Worst Enemy: Reflections on Justice]. 1948.
