= Heinrich Schiess-Gemuseus =

Swiss ophthalmologist (1833–1914)

Heinrich Schiess-Gemuseus, name sometimes given as Heinrich Schiess (3 January 1833, in Heiden – 12 September 1914) was a Swiss ophthalmologist.

He studied medicine at the University of Basel, the University of Würzburg, the Ludwig-Maximilians-Universität München, and the University of Vienna, where he learned ophthalmology as a pupil of Eduard Jäger von Jaxtthal and Karl Stellwag von Carion. In 1858, by way of an invitation from Albrecht von Graefe, he moved to the Friedrich Wilhelm University of Berlin, where he studied under pathologist Rudolf Virchow. In 1864, he obtained his habilitation at the University of Basel, and during the same year, opened a private eye hospital. In 1867, he became an associate professor at the university, followed by a full professorship nine years later.

He specialized in ocular histopathology, and was the author of around 64 papers on clinical and histopathological subjects. At Basel, he was notably the eye doctor of Friedrich Nietzsche.

== Selected works ==
- Versuch einer speziellen Neurologie der Rana esculenta, 1857 – Essay on the special neurology of Rana esculenta.
- Beitrag zur Therapie der Myopie, 1872 – Contribution to the therapy of myopia.
- Zur Casuistik der Iristumoren, 1877 – Casuistry of iris tumors.
- Metastatisches Sarcom der Papille und angrenzenden Retina, 1878 – Metastatic sarcoma of the papilla and adjacent retina.
- Ueber Schneeblindheit, 1879 – On snow blindness.
- Kurzer Leitfaden der Refractions- und Accommodations-Anomalien, 1893 – A short guide to refraction and accommodation abnormalities.
