= Riesman's sign =

- Differential diagnosis: Graves' disease

Riesman's sign is a clinical sign in which a bruit, or murmur, can be heard using a stethoscope over the closed eye. It is found in patients with Graves' disease.

The sign is named after David Riesman.
