= Chemosis =

Swelling of the conjunctiva

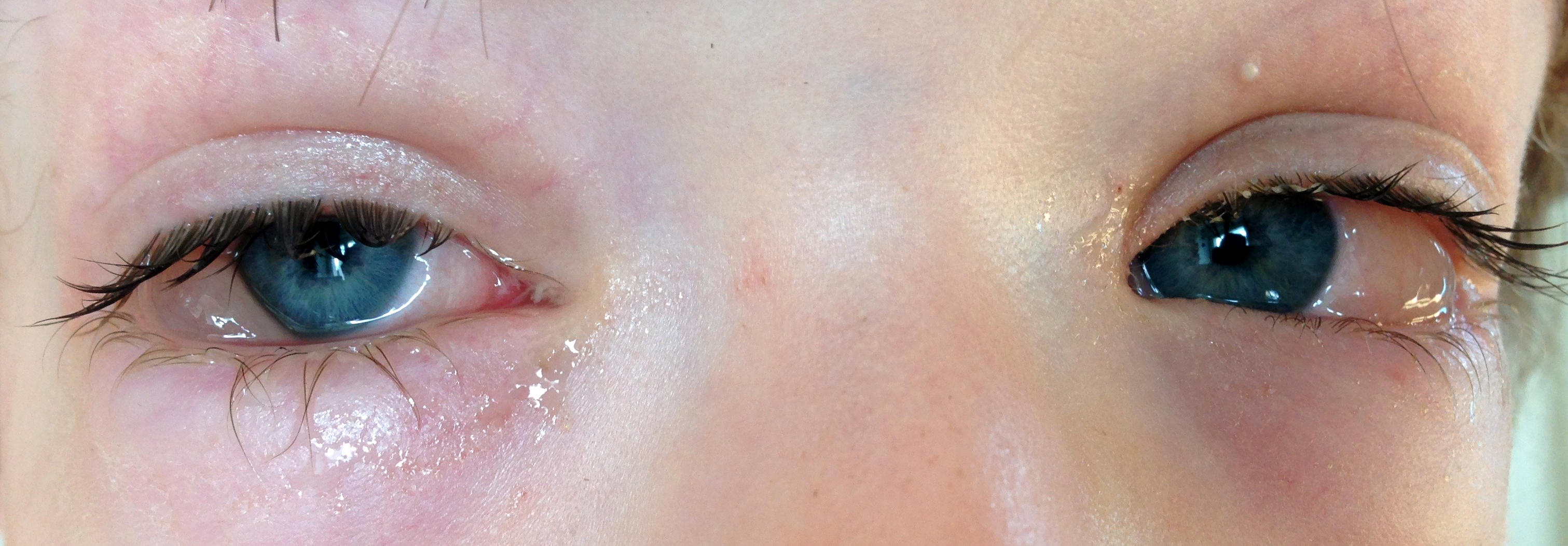
- Example of chemosis
- Specialty: Ophthalmology; Otorhinolaryngology; (eye/nose/throat medicine)

Chemosis is the swelling (or edema) of the conjunctiva (the lining of the white of the eye). The term derives from Ancient Greek: χήμη, romanized: khḗmē, meaning 'cockleshell', due to the swollen conjunctiva resembling it, and -osis, meaning 'condition or disorder'. The swelling is due to the oozing of exudate from abnormally permeable capillaries. In general, chemosis is a nonspecific sign of eye irritation. The outer surface covering appears to have fluid in it. The conjunctiva becomes swollen and gelatinous in appearance. Often, the eye area swells so much that the eyes become difficult or impossible to close fully. Sometimes, it may also appear as if the iris has moved slightly backwards from the white part of the eye, due to the builup of fluid in the conjunctiva. The iris is not covered by the conjunctiva, and so it appears to be moved slightly inwards.

== Causes ==
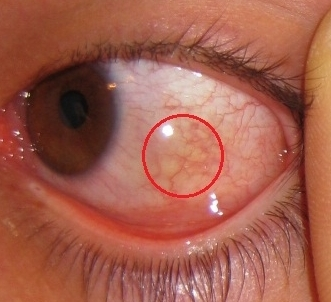
An eye with a swollen region of the conjunctiva (front view).

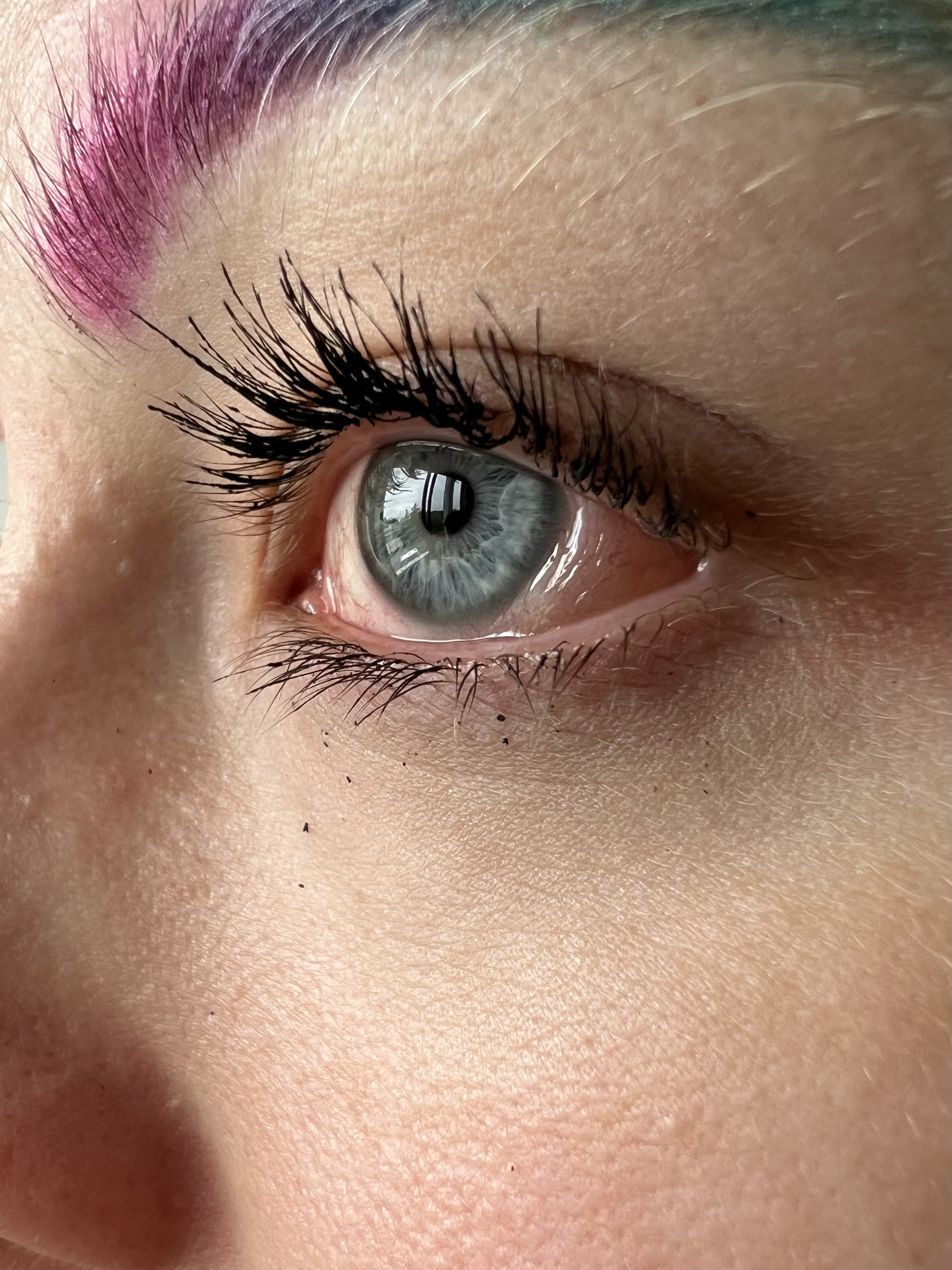
An eye with a swollen region of the conjunctiva.

It is usually caused by allergies or viral infections, often inciting excessive eye rubbing. Chemosis is also included in the Chandler Classification system of orbital infections.

If chemosis has occurred due to excessive rubbing of the eye, the first aid to be given is a cold water wash for eyes.

Other causes of chemosis include:

- Superior vena cava obstruction, accompanied by facial oedema
- Hyperthyroidism, associated with exophthalmos, periorbital puffiness, lid retraction, and lid lag
- Cavernous sinus thrombosis, associated with infection of the paranasal sinuses, proptosis, periorbital oedema, retinal haemorrhages, papilledema, extraocular movement abnormalities, and trigeminal nerve sensory loss
- Carotid-cavernous fistula – classic triad of chemosis, pulsatile proptosis, and ocular bruit
- Cluster headache
- Trichinellosis
- Systemic lupus erythematosus (SLE)
- Angioedema
- Acute glaucoma
- Panophthalmitis
- Orbital cellulitis
- Gonorrheal conjunctivitis
- Dacryocystitis
- Spitting cobra venom to the eye
- Exposure to chemical agents such as phenacyl chloride, pepper spray, or "mace spray"
- Urticaria
- Trauma, including surgical trauma
- Keratitis
- Mucor infection
- Rhabdomyosarcoma of the orbit

== Diagnosis ==
An eye doctor may most often diagnose chemosis by doing a physical examination of the affected area. They can also ask questions about the severity and length of other symptoms.

== Treatment ==
Treatment depends on the cause of the chemosis.
