= Receptor =

Receptor may refer to:

- Sensory receptor, in physiology, any neurite structure that, on receiving environmental stimuli, produces an informative nerve impulse
- Receptor (biochemistry), in biochemistry, a protein molecule that receives and responds to a neurotransmitter, or other substance
  - Cell surface receptor, a receptor on the outer surface of a cell membrane, that takes part in communication between the cell and the outside world
  - Nuclear receptor, a receptor found within cells that is responsible for sensing steroid and thyroid hormones and certain other molecules
  - Immune receptor, a receptor that occurs on the surface of immunocytes and binds to antigens
- Receiver (radio), a device for the reception of electromagnetic signals.
