= David Riesman (physician) =

German-American physician (1867–1940)

David Riesman (1867 in Saxe-Weimar – 1940) was a German-born American physician remembered for describing Riesman's sign. He graduated M.D. from the University of Pennsylvania in 1892. He wrote a number of books on pathology and the history of medicine. He founded a history of medicine course at the University of Pennsylvania, where he was professor of clinical medicine from 1912 to 1933. After 1933, he became professor of the history of medicine until his death.

His son was the American sociologist David Riesman (1909–2002).
