= William Dalrymple (surgeon) =

English surgeon (1772-1847)

- Born: 17 August 1772; Norwich, United Kingdom
- Died: 5 December 1847 (aged 75); London, United Kingdom
- Burial place: Highgate Cemetery
- Years active: 1793–1844
- Known for: Tying the carotid artery
- Relatives: John Dalrymple (son)
- Medical career
- Profession: Surgeon
- Institutions: Norfolk and Norwich Hospital

William Dalrymple (17 August 1772 – 5 December 1847) was an English surgeon. He learned his trade in London and practised in Norwich, initially from his father's house and later in the Norfolk and Norwich Hospital. He received attention for successfully performing the then rare operation of tying the carotid artery.

== Early life ==
Dalrymple was born in 1772 in Norwich, England, where his father, a native of Dumfriesshire and relative of the Earl of Stair, had settled. He was initially educated at the Grammar School in Aylsham then at Norwich School under Dr. Parr, and among his school friends was Edward Maltby, afterwards bishop of Durham. After an apprenticeship in London to Messrs. Devaynes & Hingeston, court apothecaries, and studying at the Borough hospitals under Henry Cline and Astley Cooper, he returned to Norwich in 1793 and opened a surgery in his father's house.

== Medical career ==
His ardent advocacy of liberal opinions slowed his progress for some years, and it was not till 1812 that he became assistant-surgeon of the Norfolk and Norwich Hospital, being elected a full surgeon in 1814. In 1813 he attracted great attention by his successful performance of the then rare operation of tying the common carotid artery. He attained great success as an operator, especially in lithotomy.

He formed a valuable collection of anatomical and pathological preparations, which he gave to the Norfolk and Norwich Hospital on his retirement from practice in 1844.

== Later life ==
He married in July 1799 Miss Marianne Bertram, by whom he had a family of six sons and three daughters, who survived him. Among them was John Dalrymple (1803–1852).

In 1839 he retired his position as surgeon due to his health giving way; his many operative successes had been won in spite of feeble health. He retired entirely from practice in 1844. His last years were passed in London, where he died on 5 December 1847. He is interred directly below the surgeon Robert Liston in the Terrace Catacombs on the west side of Highgate Cemetery.

== Character sketch ==
George Thomas Bettany, writing in the Dictionary of National Biography, described Dalrymple's character: "His sense of responsibility and honour was high, his character and conversation were elevated, and his teaching judicious."

== Bibliography ==
Besides a few papers in medical journals, Dalrymple made no contribution to literature. Among his papers may be mentioned "A Case of Trismus", in Edinburgh Medical and Surgical Journal, vol. i. 1805; and "A Case of Aneurism cured by Tying the Left Common Carotid Artery", in Medico-Chirurgical Transactions, vol. vi. 1815.
