= John Dalrymple (physician) =

British ophthalmologist

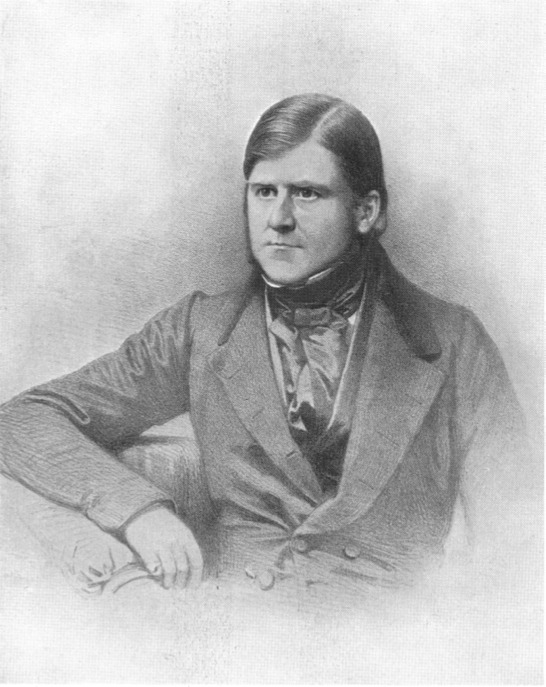
- John Dalrymple, lithograph
- Born: April 17, 1804; Norwich, United Kingdom
- Died: 2 May 1852 (aged 48); London, United Kingdom
- Education: University of Edinburgh
- Years active: 1827-1852
- Known for: Bence Jones protein, Dalrymple's sign
- Relatives: William Dalrymple (surgeon) (father)
- Medical career
- Profession: Surgeon
- Institutions: Royal London Ophthalmic Hospital
- Sub-specialties: Ophthalmology
- Research: Ophthalmology, Histology

John Dalrymple FRS (17 April 1804 – 2 May 1852) was an English ophthalmologist who was born in Norwich, the son of William Dalrymple. In 1827 he graduated from the University of Edinburgh, and subsequently became an eye surgeon at the Royal London Ophthalmic Hospital.

He was elected assistant-surgeon in 1832 and full surgeon in 1843. In 1850 he was chosen a fellow of the Royal Society, and in 1851 a member of the council of the Royal College of Surgeons of England.

Dalrymple is remembered for his histological work done with Henry Bence Jones (1814-1873) in the discovery of the albumin that was to become known as Bence Jones protein. This protein is often found in the blood and urine of patients with multiple myeloma. He published his findings in a treatise called On the microscopic character of mollities ossium.

Dalrymple also composed two important books on ophthalmology called "The anatomy of the human eye" (1834) and "Pathology of the human eye" (1852). The eponymous Dalrymple's sign is named after him, which is an abnormal wideness of the palpebral fissures in exophthalmic goiter.

Having had poor health his entire life, Dalrymple died on May 2, 1852, at the age of 48, due to renal disease. He was interred with his father William in the Terrace Catacombs on the western side of Highgate Cemetery.
