= Albrecht von Graefe (ophthalmologist) =

German ophthalmologist

Albrecht von Gräfe
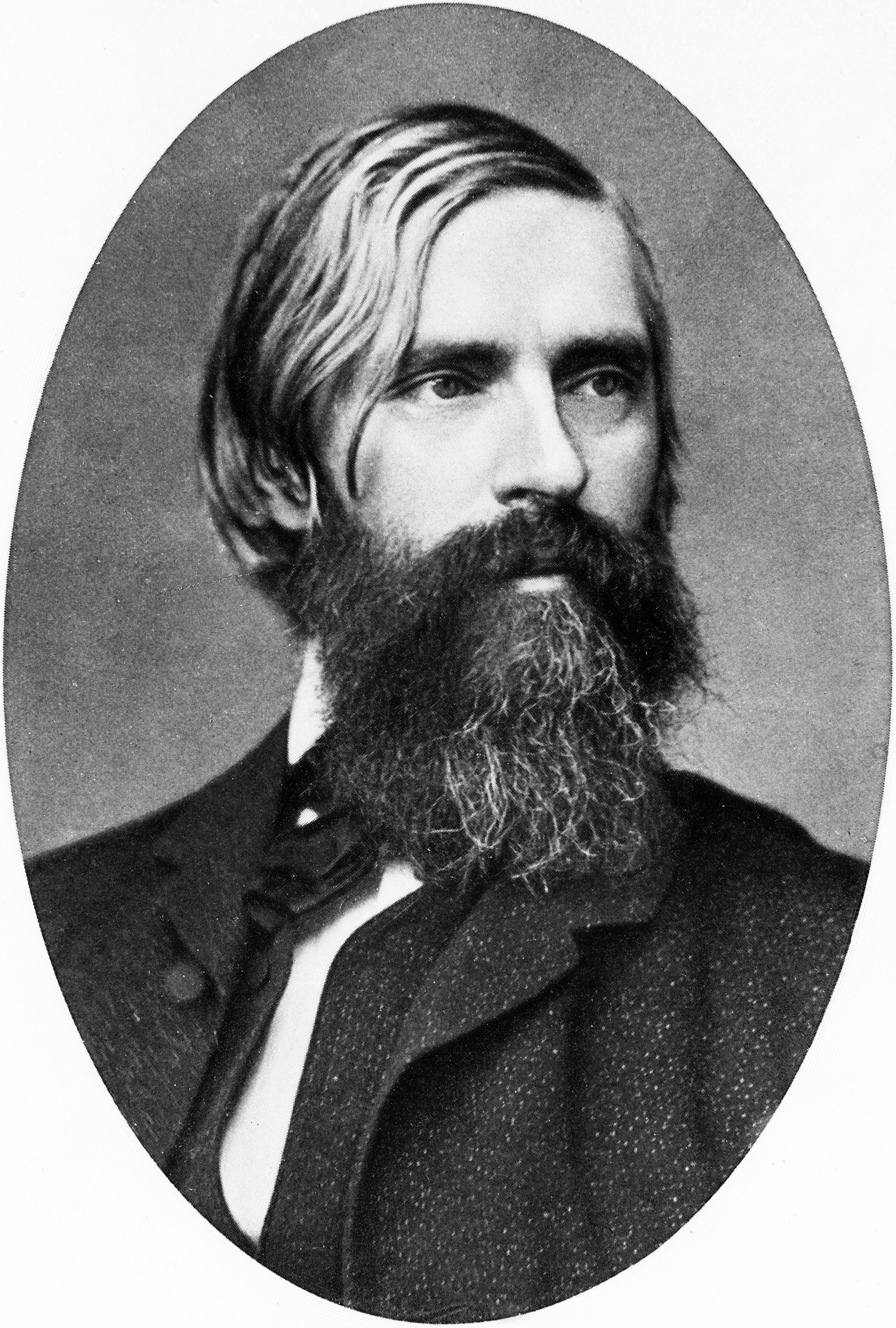
- Born: 22 May 1828; Finkenheerd, Brandenburg
- Died: 20 July 1870 (aged 42); Berlin, Brandenburg
- Education: Humboldt University of Berlin
- Known for: treatment of glaucoma
- Scientific career
- Fields: ophthalmology

Friedrich Wilhelm Ernst Albrecht von Gräfe, often Anglicized to Graefe (22 May 1828 – 20 July 1870), was a Prussian pioneer of German ophthalmology. Graefe was born in Finkenheerd, Brandenburg, the son of Karl Ferdinand von Graefe (1787–1840). He was the father of the far right politician Albrecht von Graefe (1868–1933).

== Background ==
At the University of Berlin, Graefe studied philosophy, logic, natural sciences and anatomy, under notable names such as Dove, H. Rose, Müller, and Schlemm, eventually obtaining his medical doctorate in 1847. He continued his studies at Prague, Paris, Vienna and London, and having devoted special attention to ophthalmology, in 1850, he began to practice as an oculist in Berlin. Here, he founded a private institution for the treatment of eyes. During the same year, he received his habilitation with the thesis Über die Wirkung der Augenmuskeln.

In 1858 he became an associate professor of ophthalmology at the Charité in Berlin, where in 1866 he was appointed a full professor. In 1870, he was elected a foreign member of the Royal Swedish Academy of Sciences.

In 1862 he married Anna Knuth. The couple had three children, two of whom died in infancy.

Graefe died in Berlin from pulmonary tuberculosis on 20 July 1870. His grave is preserved in the Protestant Friedhof II der Jerusalems- und Neuen Kirchengemeinde (Cemetery No. II of the congregations of Jerusalem's Church and New Church) in Berlin-Kreuzberg, south of Hallesches Tor.

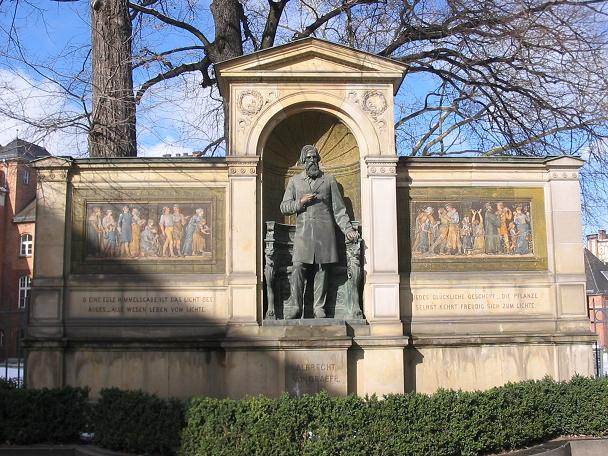
Memorial at the Charité Berlin by Rudolf Siemering

== Contributions ==
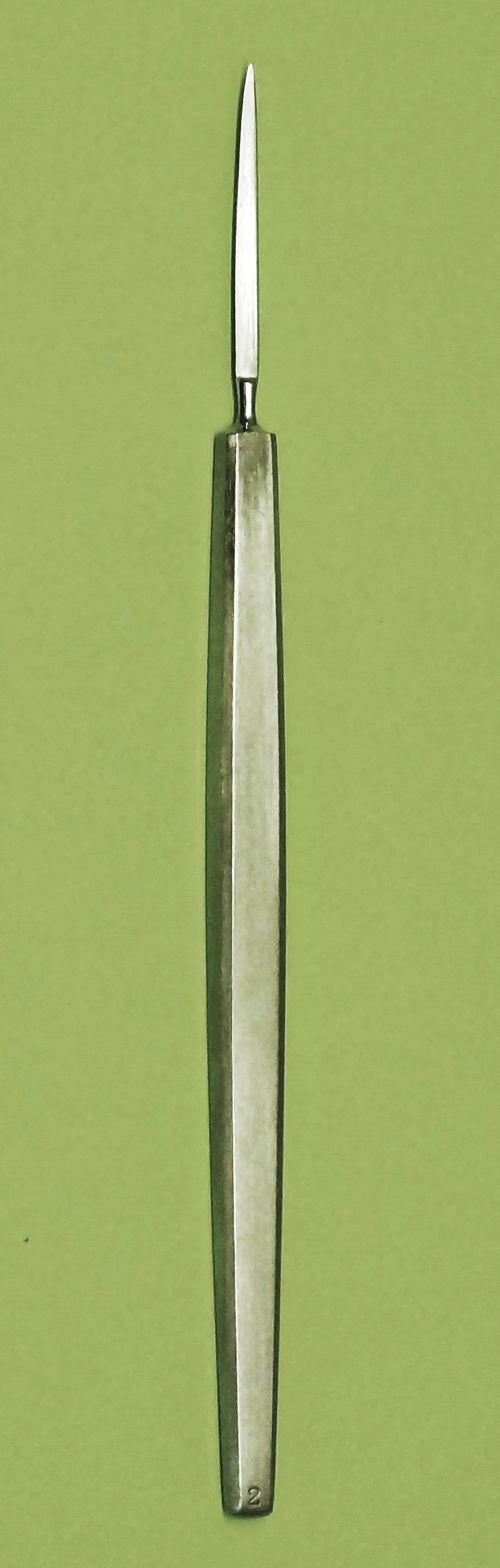
Cataract knife according to Graefe

Graefe made many contributions to ophthalmological science, being considered one of the more important (if not the most important) figures in 19th century ophthalmology. Among his achievements were a method of treating glaucoma and a new operation for cataract.

He introduced iridectomy for glaucoma, identified retardation of the eyelid in Basedow's disease, and described the combination of retinitis pigmentosa and perceptive deafness in Usher's syndrome. Also, he provided early descriptions of optic neuritis (1860), chronic progressive external ophthalmoplegia (1868). and papilledema (involving four patients with brain tumor and a swelling of the optic disc). In addition, he is credited with design of a specialized knife, the "Von Graefe knife", for cataract surgery. This knife was used till the 1960s. The eponymous "Gräfe's sign" is associated with Graves-Basedow disease.

In 1855 he founded the Archiv für Ophthalmologie, in which Carl Ferdinand von Arlt (1812–1887) and Franciscus Donders (1818–1889) collaborated. In 1863 he founded the Deutsche Ophtalmologische Gesellschaft.
