= Lid lag =

Medical sign involving the human eyelid

Lid lag is the static situation in which the upper eyelid is higher than normal with the globe in downgaze. It is most often a sign of thyroid eye disease, but may also occur with cicatricial changes to the eyelid or congenital ptosis. Lid lag differs from Von Graefe's sign in that the latter is a dynamic process. It can also be the manifestation of chemosis (swelling (or edema) of the conjunctiva).
