= Karl Stellwag von Carion =

Karl Stellwag von Carion (28 January 1823 – 21 November 1904) was an Austrian ophthalmologist who was a native of Langendorf, a village in Moravia.

He studied medicine at Prague and Vienna, where in 1847 he received his medical doctorate. Following graduation he was an assistant in the department of ophthalmology at Vienna General Hospital. In 1854 he was a private lecturer at the University of Vienna, where in 1857 he attained the title of "professor extraordinarius". In 1873 he became a full professor of ophthalmology at the university. During his years in Vienna, he also taught classes at Josephs Academy (Josephinum).

Stellwag von Carion made contributions in his investigations of glaucoma, accommodation and light polarization, and is remembered for his extensive research involving anomalies of refraction. In 1856 he coined the term "ectopia lentis", when describing a patient who had congenital lens dislocation.

He was the author of many works in the field of ophthalmology, including the widely popular Lehrbuch der praktischen Augenheilkunde, a book that was later translated into Italian, Hungarian and English (Treatise on the diseases of the eye, including the anatomy of the organ). His name is lent to "Stellwag's sign", an indication of infrequent or incomplete blinking associated with exophthalmos.

== Selected publications ==
- Theorie der Augenspiegel : auf elementarem Wege aus den Grundsätzen der Optik entwickelt (Ophthalmoscope theory); 1854.
- Die Ophthalmologie vom naturwissenschaftlichen Standpunkte (Ophthalmology from a natural scientific standpoint); 1853–58.
- Lehrbuch der praktischen Augenheilkunde (Handbook of practical ophthalmology); 1862
- Atlas der pathologischen Histologie des Auges (Atlas of pathological histology of the eyes); (in collaboration with, and published by Carl Wedl (1815–1891).
- "Treatise on the diseases of the eye including the anatomy of the organ". Translated and edited by D.B. St.John Roosa, C.S. Bull and C.E. Hackley. 4th edition. William Wood & Co. New York. 1873. 915p. 124 ill.
