= Creswell Eastman =

Australian endocrinologist (1940–2025)

Creswell Eastman AO
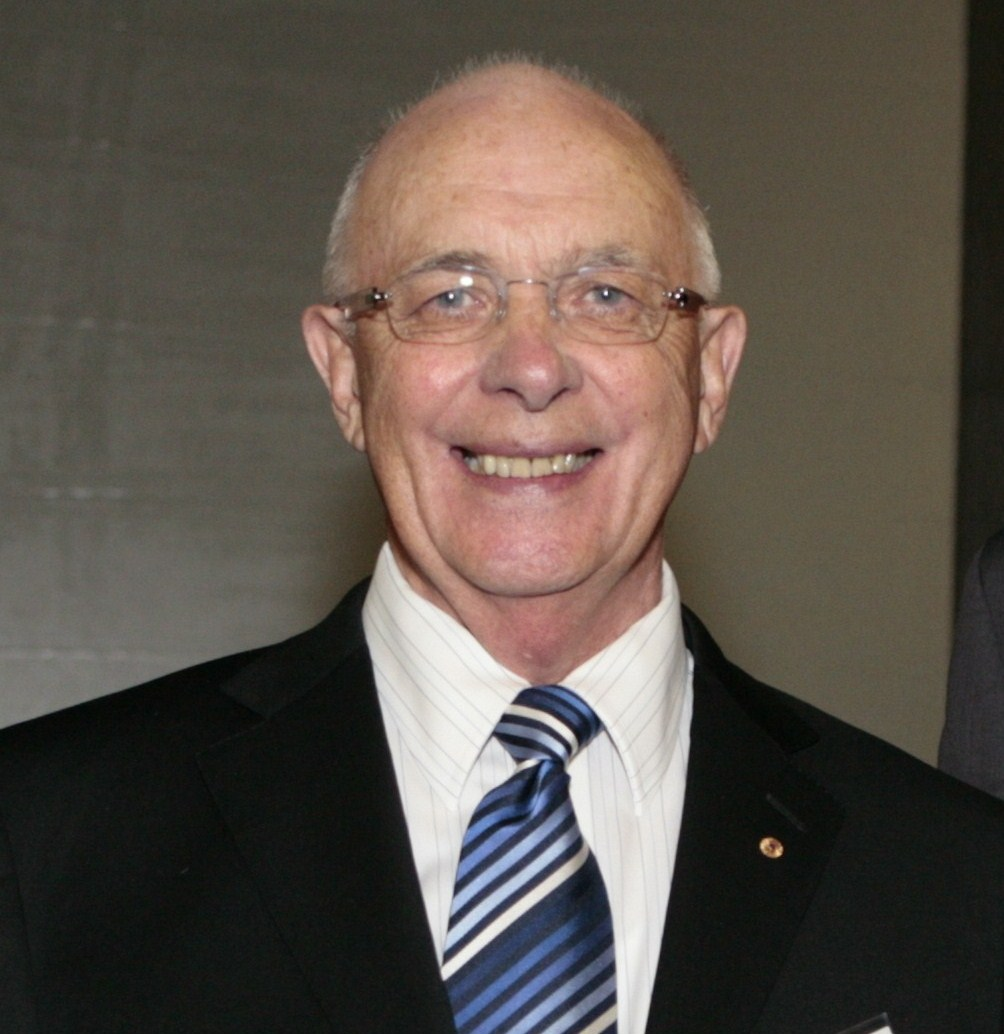
- Born: 30 March 1940; Narrandera, New South Wales, Australia
- Died: 17 May 2025 (aged 85); Sydney, New South Wales, Australia
- Education: MB BS in Medicine and Surgery; MD (Sydney University)
- Known for: Endocrinology; Iodine Deficiency Disorders; Public Health Initiatives
- Medical career
- Profession: Professor of medicine
- Field: Endocrinology, Public Health
- Institutions: University of Sydney
- Awards: Officer (AO) 2018, Member (AM) 1994 in the General Division of the Order of Australia 2014 Thailand Health Promotion Award 2006 AMA award for excellence in health care 2008 University of Sydney Alumni Award for Professional Excellence

Creswell John Eastman AO (30 March 1940 – 17 May 2025) was an Australian endocrinologist who was the Clinical Professor of Medicine at Sydney University Medical School, Principal of the Sydney Thyroid Clinic and Consultant Emeritus to the Westmead Hospital. Eastman directed or conducted research and public health projects into elimination of iodine deficiency disorders (IDD) in Malaysia, Indonesia, Laos, Cambodia, Thailand, several Pacific Islands, Hong Kong, China and Tibet and Australia. For his work in remote areas of China, he was dubbed the "man who saved a million brains".

In 2013 Eastman expressed concern that IDD may be affecting Australian children's ability to perform at school and reiterated that view in 2016. While the initial focus was mostly on indigenous children, he latterly expanded it to include all children.

== Early life and education ==
Eastman was born on 30 March 1940 in Narrandera, New South Wales. He was the fourth child of Albert Edward and Margaret Mary Eastman. He gained his primary education at Woodburn and Lismore in Northern NSW and secondary schooling at Marist Brothers Boarding School in Bowral/ Mittagong, NSW. He studied medicine at the University of Sydney, graduating as a Bachelor of Medicine, Bachelor of Surgery (MBBS) in 1965 and was awarded his Doctorate of Medicine (MD) by research thesis in 1980.

== Medical career ==
Eastman started his medical career in 1965 and was admitted as a member of the Royal Australasian College of Physicians (MRACP) in 1969 and became a fellow (FRACP) in 1974.

From 1965 to 1966, Eastman was Resident Medical Officer at St Vincent's Hospital and Medical Registrar at the same hospital from 1968 to 1969. In 1967, he became a Research Fellow in Endocrinology at the Garvan Institute of Medical Research and between 1969 and 1970 was a Research Fellow of The Asthma Foundation of New South Wales also at The Garvan Institute of Medical Research.

Eastman was awarded the Overseas Travelling Fellowship of the Royal Australasian College of Physicians (RACP) and the Searle Travel Grant in Endocrinology in 1971 and worked as a Research Fellow and Honorary Physician, Institute of Clinical Research and Institute of Nuclear Medicine, The Middlesex Hospital Medical School, London, UK from 1971 to 1972.

In 1973, he returned to Australia to become Assistant Director of the Garvan Institute of Medical Research at St Vincent's Hospital, Sydney, a position he retained until 1975. He was concurrently a Senior Research Officer with the National Health and Medical Research Council (NH&MRC); Honorary Clinical Assistant at the Endocrine Clinic, Royal Alexandra Hospital for Children, Sydney; Visiting Clinical Endocrinologist at St Margaret's Hospital, Sydney; and Clinical Tutor, Faculty of Medicine, University of New South Wales.

In 1975, Eastman was appointed Director (Foundation Head) of the Department of Endocrinology and Diabetes at Woden Valley and Canberra Hospitals, Canberra ACT; a position he held until 1979 when he returned to Sydney to become Senior Staff Specialist Endocrinology and Foundation Head Endocrine Unit, (Department of Endocrinology and Diabetes) Westmead Hospital until 1989. From 1986 to 1989, he was also Deputy Director Division of Medicine, Westmead Hospital.

In 1989, Eastman became director, Institute of Clinical Pathology and Medical Research (ICPMR), Westmead Hospital and Consultant Physician in Endocrinology, Westmead Hospital and was appointed Professor of Medicine and Pathology in the University of Sydney. He was responsible for developing a networked Pathology service for the public hospitals of Western Sydney (Westmead, Blacktown, Mt Druitt and Nepean) and ultimately regional and rural services for North West and Western NSW. In 1997, Eastman was appointed Government Analyst and Director of the Division of Analytical Laboratories (DAL) at Lidcombe providing public health and forensic laboratory services for the state of NSW, a position he held concurrently with Director of the ICPMR.

In 2006, Eastman retired as Director of the ICPMR and his concurrent roles as the Director Western Area Pathology Service (1993–2006) and Government Analyst and Director Division of Analytical Laboratories (1997–2006).

Eastman continued as Clinical Professor of Medicine/Pathology at the University of Sydney, a position he held beginning in 1990, and Consultant Emeritus at Westmead Hospital.

In association with Dr Ian Hales from Sydney and Dr Shigenobu Nagataki from Japan, Eastman was the initiator of the movement to establish an Asia Oceania Thyroid Association and held numerous positions within this organisation. He was the Treasurer, an Executive Councillor and President (1980–1982) of the Endocrine Society of Australia and was a life member. He was Member and Chairman of the National Health & Medical Research Council (NH&MRC) Regional Grants Committees and held numerous positions with the Royal Australasian College of Physicians (RACP). He was a foundation member of the board of directors of Westmead Hospital Medical Research Institute/Foundation and held numerous other senior positions within the hospital. Eastman was also a senior adviser and was a board member, from 2001, of the International Council on Control of Iodine Deficiency Disorders (ICCIDD), now rebadged as the Iodine Global Network (IGN). He was the chairman of the management committee, Australian Centre for Control of Iodine Deficiency Disorders (ACCIDD).

== Controlling and preventing IDD ==
When teaching students, Eastman explained that the average person only needs a teaspoon of iodine over his or her whole life. However, it is needed in microgram doses every day and it is particularly important for pregnant and lactating women as they supply the necessary iodine to the developing foetus and newborn baby. Even mild Iodine deficiency can cause goitres and decreased IQ. Severe iodine deficiency can likely lead to cretinism if it occurs in a child's early development.

=== Malaysia ===
Eastman's research into IDD within specific populations started in the late 1970s when he and Dr Glen Maberly visited remote parts of Sarawak, Malaysia where a large percentage of the villagers had goitres. The research was focused on determining the cause, and iodine deficiency was identified. To confirm their diagnosis the research team organised to have tiny doses of iodine introduced into the water being delivered to the village long houses. After 12 months the goitres in children had disappeared, proving iodine deficiency was the problem. Subsequently, the Malaysian government regulated that only iodized salt could be imported into Sarawak and the problem was thought to have been eliminated. A 2008 study published in 2013 found that only 46% of salt in Sarawak has been iodized and while rural children had a lower goitre incidence rate, the study "revealed that the population in Sarawak were of borderline iodine sufficient with mild IDD seen in rural areas". A study from 1998 continues to advocate for the introduction of iodine into water.

=== China ===
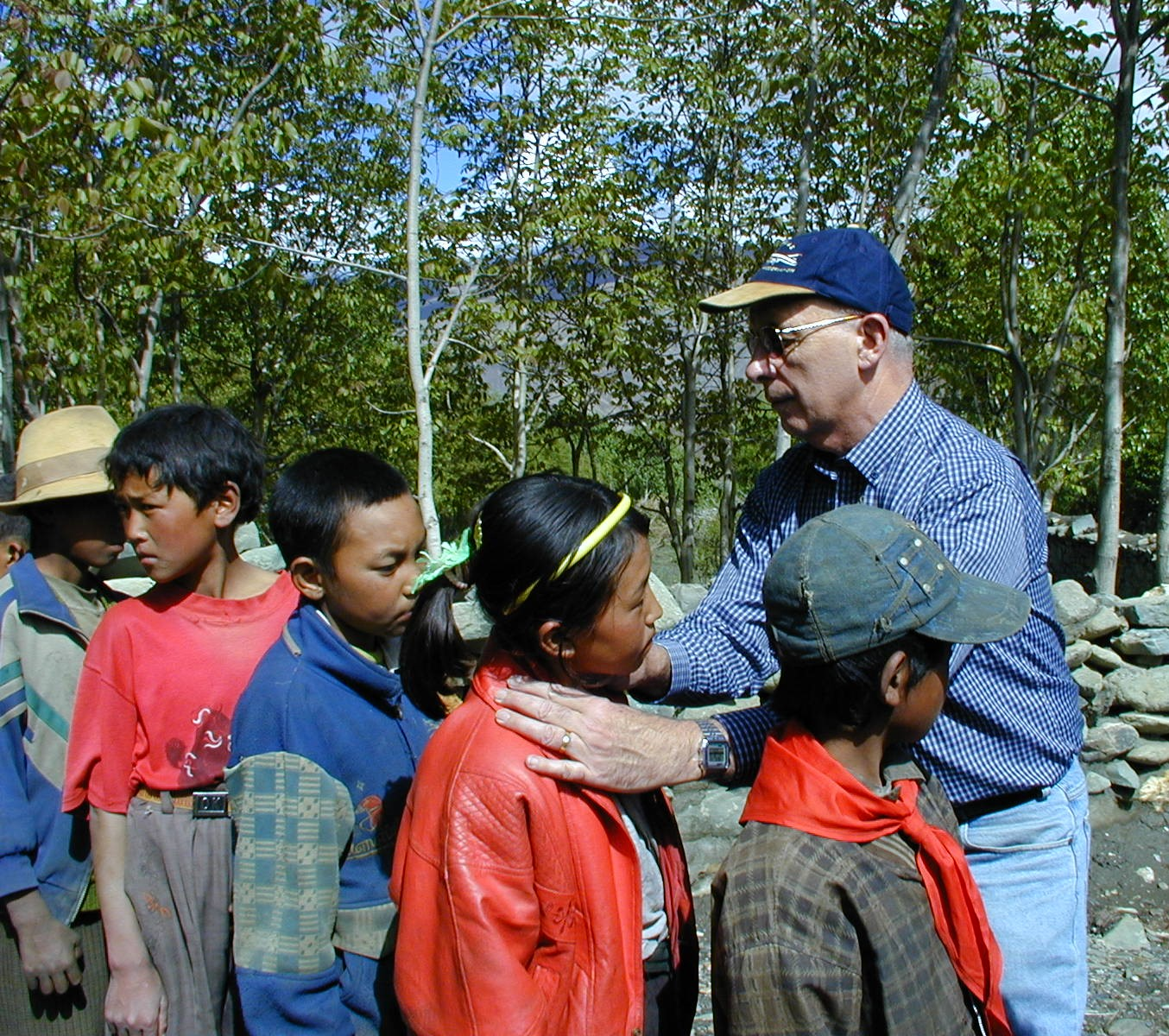
Eastman examining Tibetan schoolchildren for goitre in Tibet Autonomous Region May 2000

In the early 1980s, it was estimated that 25% (250 to 300 million people) of the Chinese population was suffering from goitre and millions more had some level of intellectual disability. Once the problem and solution had been identified, the Chinese Government moved to have all salt iodized. Since then the goitre rate is down to 5% and no new congenital iodine deficiency syndrome have been recognised in recent years.

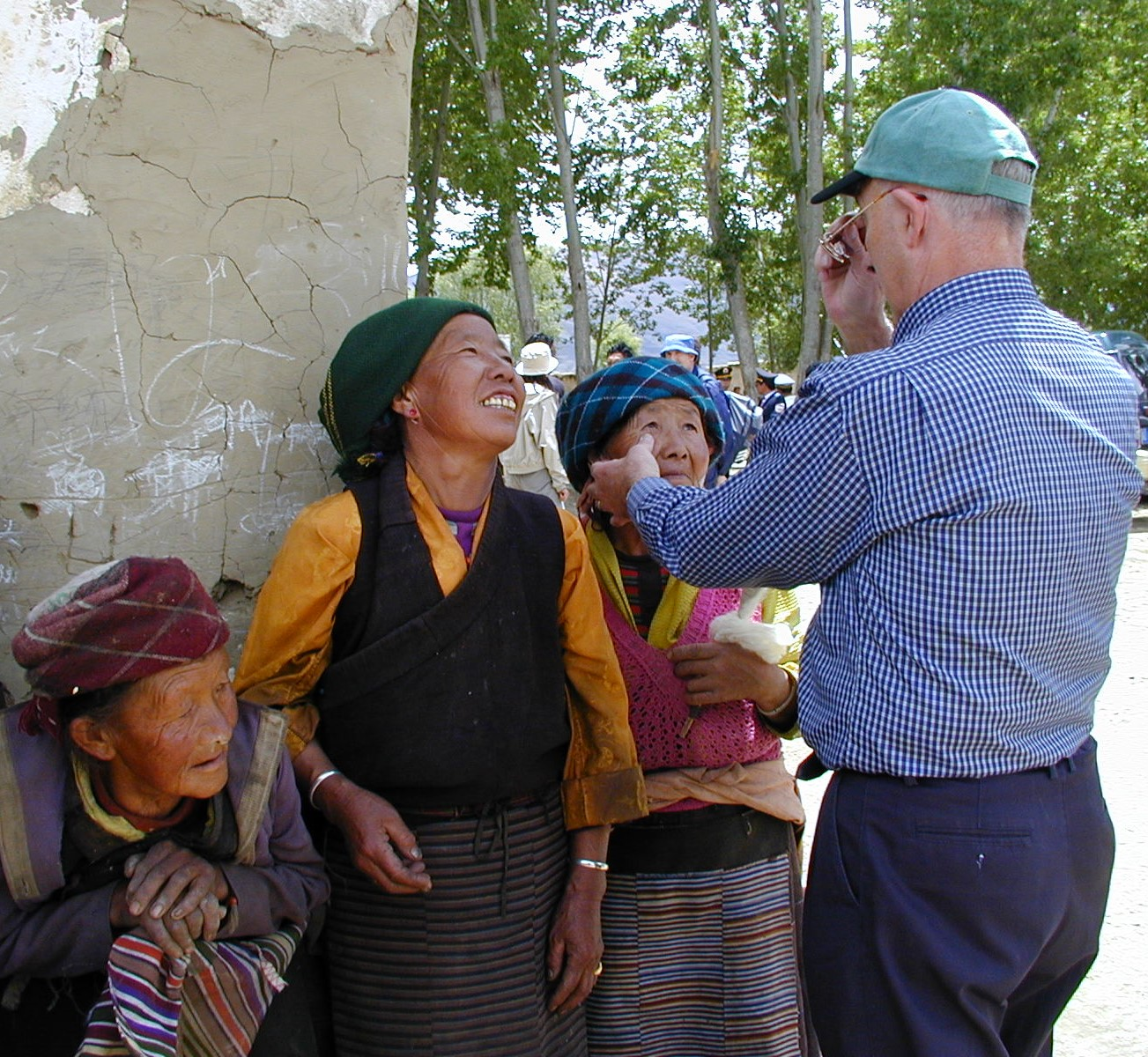
Eastman examining Tibetan women for eye disorders in Tibet Autonomous Region May 2000

During his first visit to the Tibet Autonomous Region, Eastman discovered that 13% of the population was afflicted with cretinism which he believed was a result of severe Iodine Deficiency. With the support of the Australian International Development Assistance Bureau (AIDAB, now AusAID) Eastman, assisted by Dr Mu Li, led a highly successful multimillion-dollar Australian Overseas Aid project in China, between 1985 and 1992, aimed at controlling and preventing iodine deficiency disorders in rural Chinese populations. Eastman's work in China continued after the end of the aid program. He was an International Consultant in Endemic Diseases to the Ministry of Public Health of the People's Republic of China and Honorary Professor of Medicine in Tianjin Medical College. He held a similar consultant appointment to the Tibet Autonomous Region. In a radio interview in 2015 Eastman noted that an independent survey in Tibet around 2010 found no new cases of cretinism in children under 5 years old as a result of an iodized oil and iodized salt program introduced in 2000.

=== Thailand ===
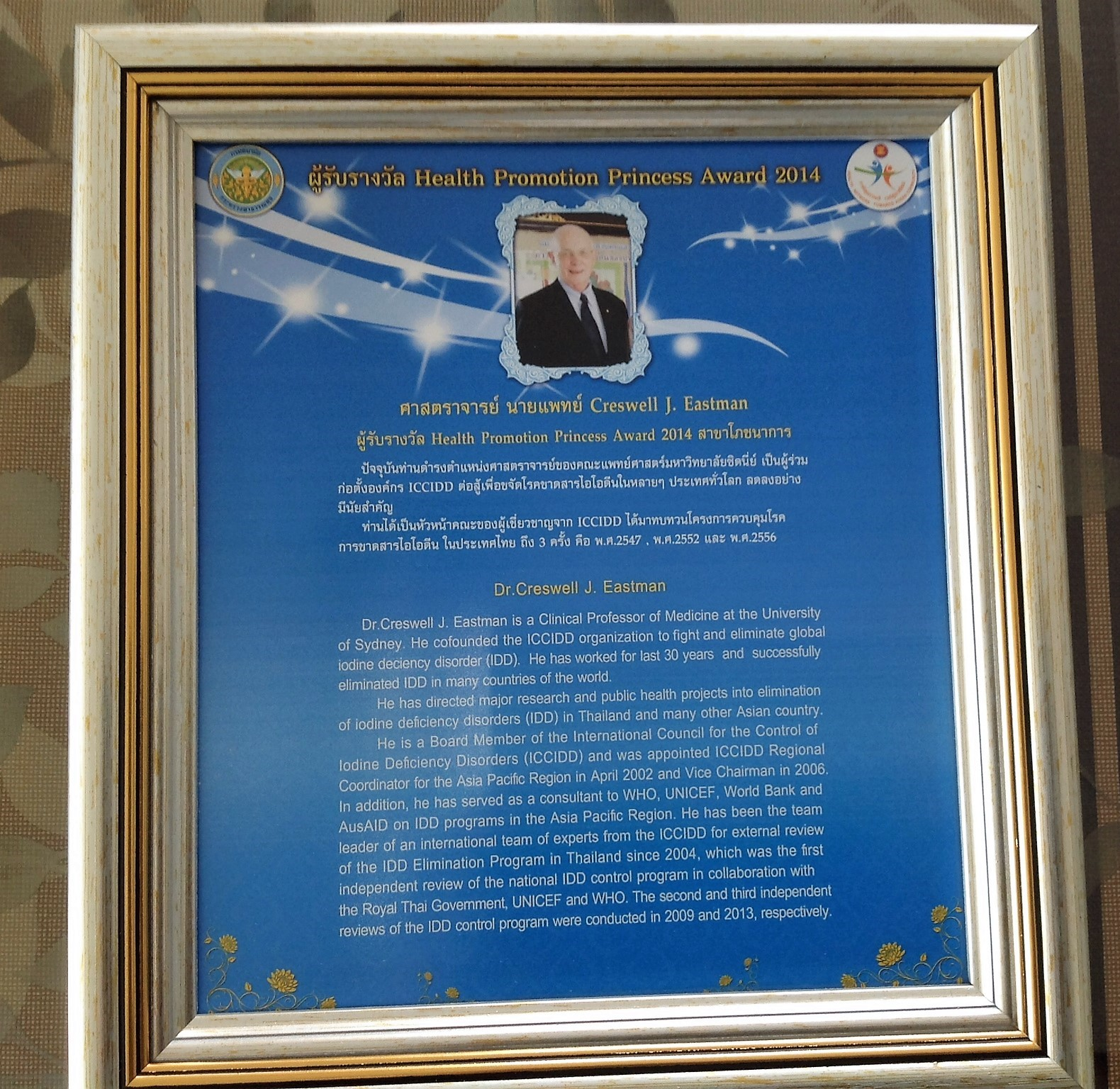
The 2014 Health Promotion Princess Award for assisting in the elimination of IDD in Thailand

Thailand has identified iodine deficiency and has implemented programs to have iodized salt (universal salt iodization) within the country. However, with shifting priorities, the effectiveness of programs can change and in 2004 the director-general of the Department of Health of the Ministry of Health, Thailand, requested the Network for the Sustained Elimination of Iodine Deficiency to undertake an external review of the Thai IDD programme, which was led by Eastman. This program developed numerous recommendations in program policy and management: salt production and iodization; monitoring, surveillance and quality assurance; advocacy and communication. In 2006 the National IDD Control Board (NIDDCB) met, presided over by Princess Maha Chakri Sirindhorn to develop an IDD 5 Year Master Plan based on the 2004 report. In 2009, a review of the master plan was undertaken. While progress had been made, universal salt iodization remained a problem, and 17 additional recommendations were made. A further review was completed in 2013. For his work in assisting in the elimination of IDD in Thailand Eastman was awarded the 2014 Health Promotion Princess Award.

=== Polynesia and Micronesia ===
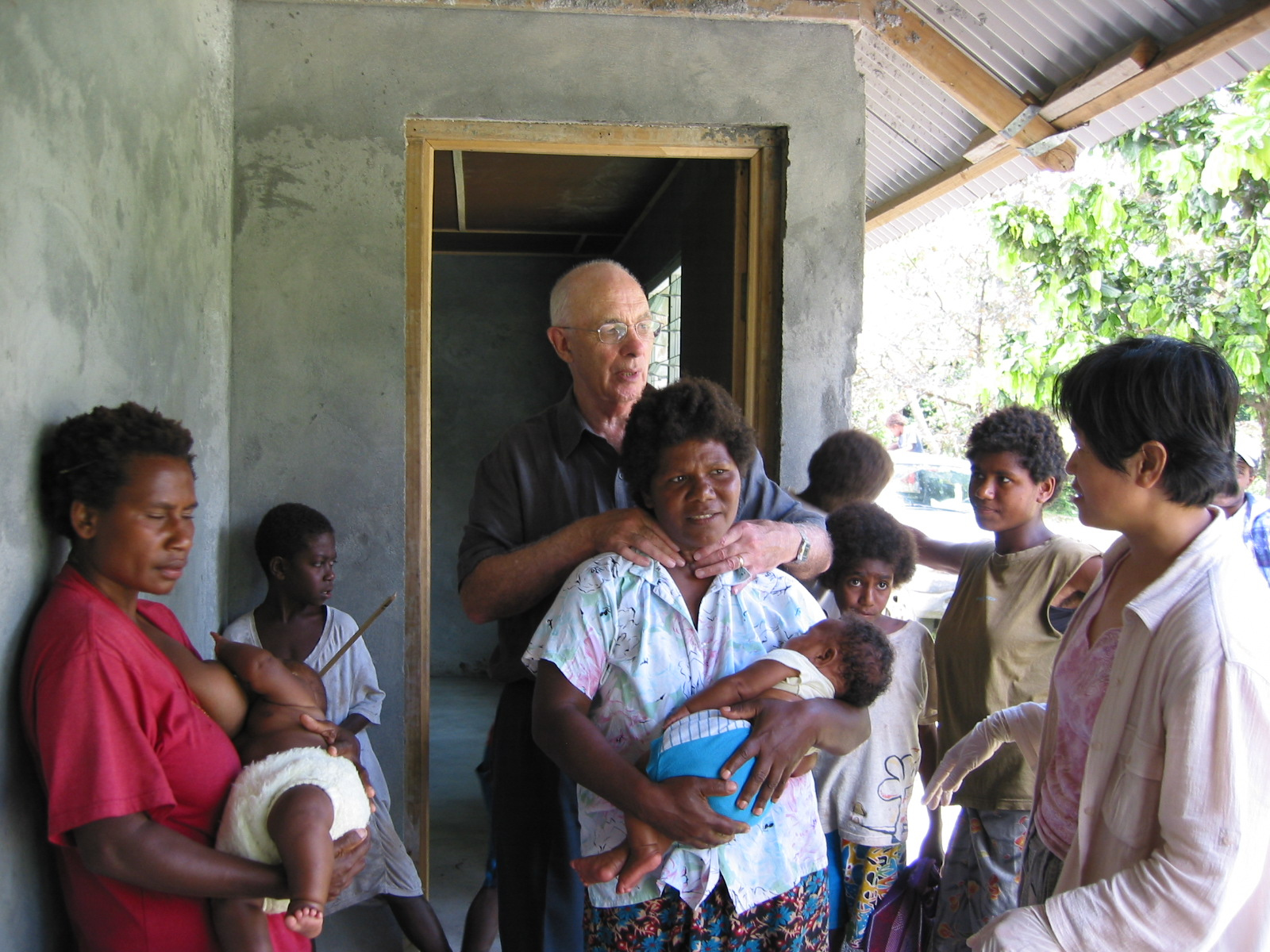
Thyroid examination for goitre in nursing mother on the island of Tanna in Vanuatu November 2006

Eastman instigated or participated in a number of studies within Polynesia and Micronesia. Although it is generally thought that people close to the sea are less likely to suffer from IDD, studies have identified iodine deficiency in these islands. In a study published in 2008 the children on the island of Tanna in Vanuatu were shown to suffer from moderate iodine deficiency. Only 40% of the children on Tanna ate fish on a weekly basis and only 30% ate fresh fish, which is insufficient to ensure an adequate daily iodine intake. Papua New Guinea has had a universal salt iodization strategy since 1995 and the results of a study published in 2008 found that iodine deficiency was not a major a problem but some issues were found in breastfeeding mothers. A survey in Samoa in 2015 showed probable iodine deficiency in women and Samoa does not have mandatory iodization of salt.

=== Australia ===
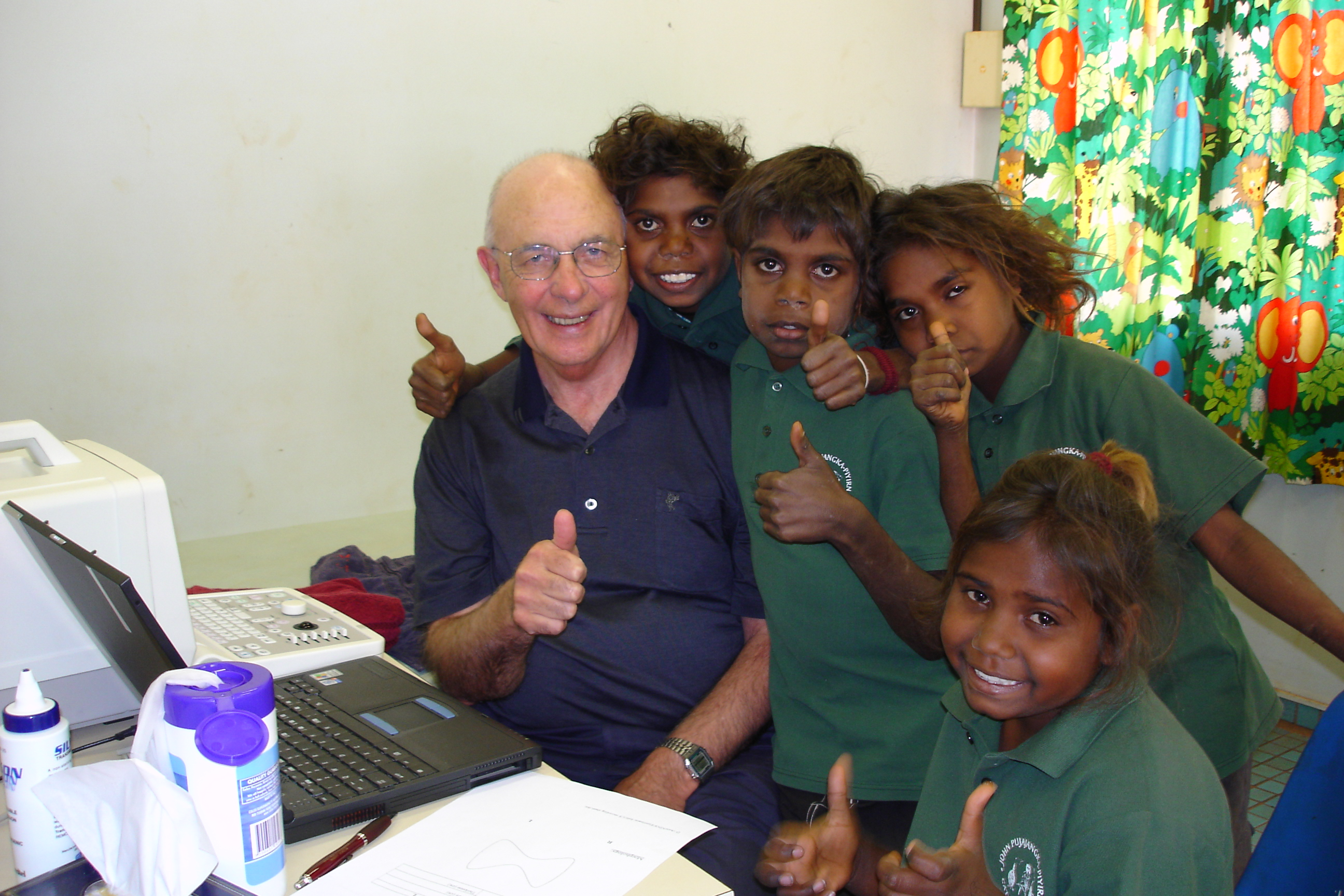
Aboriginal children from Balgo settlement in Western Australia examined by thyroid ultrasound 2004

Eastman and others undertook the National Iodine Nutrition Survey from 2003 to 2005 in Australia, confirming that iodine deficiency has re-emerged in Australia. However, for logistical reasons the Northern Territory was not included. As a result of this study, legislation made it mandatory to use iodized salt in all bread made in Australia, (excluding "organic bread") from September 2009. While Eastman agreed that the addition of iodized salt to bread had helped the situation, he remained very concerned about the iodine intake of Australian pregnant and lactating women and also for the inhabitants of remote communities in the Northern Territory and northwest Western Australia.

Eastman was passionate about the need to ensure that pregnant or lactating women had sufficient iodine in their diet.

"Beginning from the time of conception, we need to concentrate on the first 1000 days of life, the critical period for brain development and maturation. The World Health Organisation states quite categorically that environmental iodine deficiency, occurring during pregnancy, is the commonest global cause of impaired brain development resulting in loss of intelligence and other subtle brain disorders. In other words, iodine deficiency at this critical time will adversely affect the child, irrespective of the level of the inherited intelligence".

His preferred method of delivery for pregnant and lactating women was via oral iodine supplements. In his day to day practice at the Sydney Thyroid Clinic he gave priority to pregnant women. Eastman's work in China indicates that adequate iodine intake has resulted in an overall increase in the national IQ. He was of the opinion that recent testing of children in Australia that showed a decline in results in Australian children may be caused by iodine deficiency. This was a problem that he previously flagged in 2007: "If we don't address this in Australia then we are likely to see a lot of children born in coming years that have lower IQs, have problems with hearing, have great learning difficulties and they are less likely to fulfill their genetic potential."

== Personal life ==
Eastman was married to Annette, whom he met while a medical student, and had four children Katherine (Kate), born 1966; Damien, born 1968; Phillipa, born 1970 and Nicholas, born 1974.

=== Death ===
Eastman died at his home in Sydney on 17 May 2025, at the age of 85.

== Awards and recognition ==
- Little Shop Research Fellow, St. Vincent's Hospital, Sydney
- 1970–1971 Overseas Travelling Fellowship in Clinical Medicine and The Allied Sciences of the Royal Australasian College of Physicians
- 1982 Otsuka Gold Medal Research Award of the Asia Oceania Thyroid Association
- 1988 Australian International Development Assistance Bureau (AIDAB) Bicentennial Award for Excellence in Overseas Aid project (1988) with G.F. Maberly
- 1994 Government Technology Productivity Silver Award (1994) for implementation of the Cerner PathNet Laboratory Information System in Westmead Hospital (Project Director: C.J. Eastman)
- 1994 Eastman was awarded Membership of the Order of Australia for his contributions to Medicine, particularly in the field of Endocrinology
- 1998 Honorary Professor of Medicine Tianjin University Medical College, Tianjin, People's Republic of China
- 2000 Patron and Principal Medical Adviser of the Australian Thyroid Foundation
- 2003 Made Life Member of the Endocrine Association of Australia.
- 2003 NSW Finalist: “Senior Australian of the Year”
- 2004 Eastman honoured by Princess Maha Chakri Sirindhorn at a special ceremony in the Chitralada Palace, Bangkok for services to the improvement of the health of the people of Thailand.
- 2006 AMA National Award for Excellence in Health Care delivery
- 2008 University of Sydney Alumni Award for Professional Excellence
- 2011 Peter Heiman Plenary Lecture International Association of Endocrine Surgeons Yokohama Japan
- 2018 Officer of the Order of Australia for "distinguished service to medicine, particularly to the discipline of pathology, through leadership roles, to medical education, and as a contributor to international public health projects."
- 2019 Distinguished Service Award of the AOTA (Asia and Oceania Thyroid Association) for " his distinguished contributions to clinical and laboratory thyroidology, his work to establish and support AOTA, his regional and international work in the epidemiology and eradication of iodine deficiency disease (IDD), and his mentoring of colleagues to develop and contribute to clinical thyroidology in our region."
