= Endemic goitre =

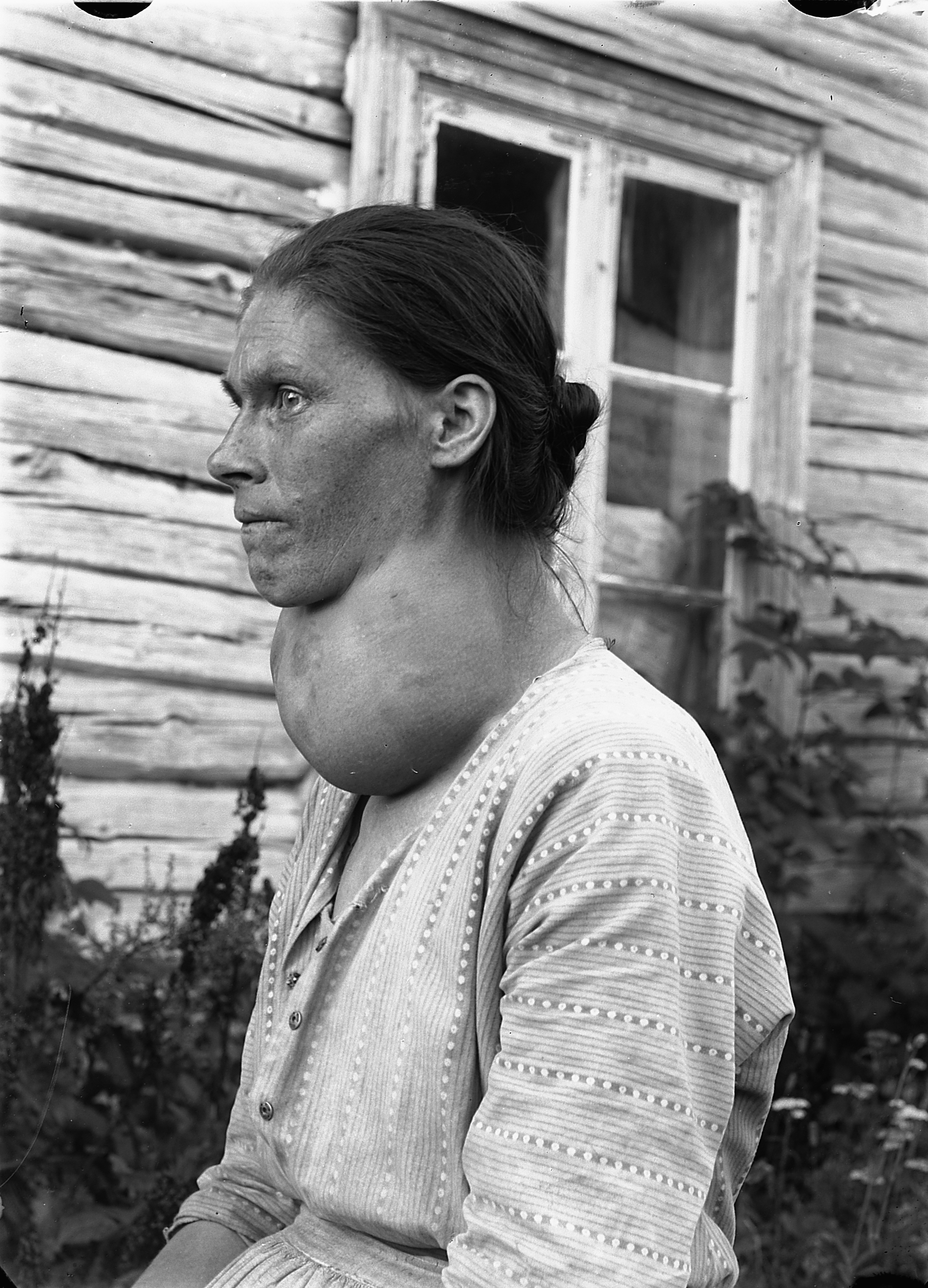
- A woman, probably from inland of Norway, with goiter, probably due to iodine deficiency.
- Specialty: Endocrinology
- Symptoms: Goitre
- Causes: Iodine deficiency

Endemic goitre (Commonwealth English) or endemic goiter (American English) is a type of goitre that is associated with dietary iodine deficiency.

== Cause ==
Some inland areas, where soil and water lacks iodine compounds and consumption of marine foods is low, are known for higher incidence of goitre. In such areas goitre is said to be "endemic".

== Prevention ==
This type of goitre is easily preventable. In most developed countries regulations have been put into force by health policy institutions requiring salt, flour or water to be fortified with iodine.

== Treatment ==
Treatment of endemic goitre is medical with iodine and thyroxine preparations. Surgery is only necessary in cases that are complicated by significant compression of nearby structures.
