= Goitre =

Neck swelling due to enlarged thyroid gland

- Other names: Goiter
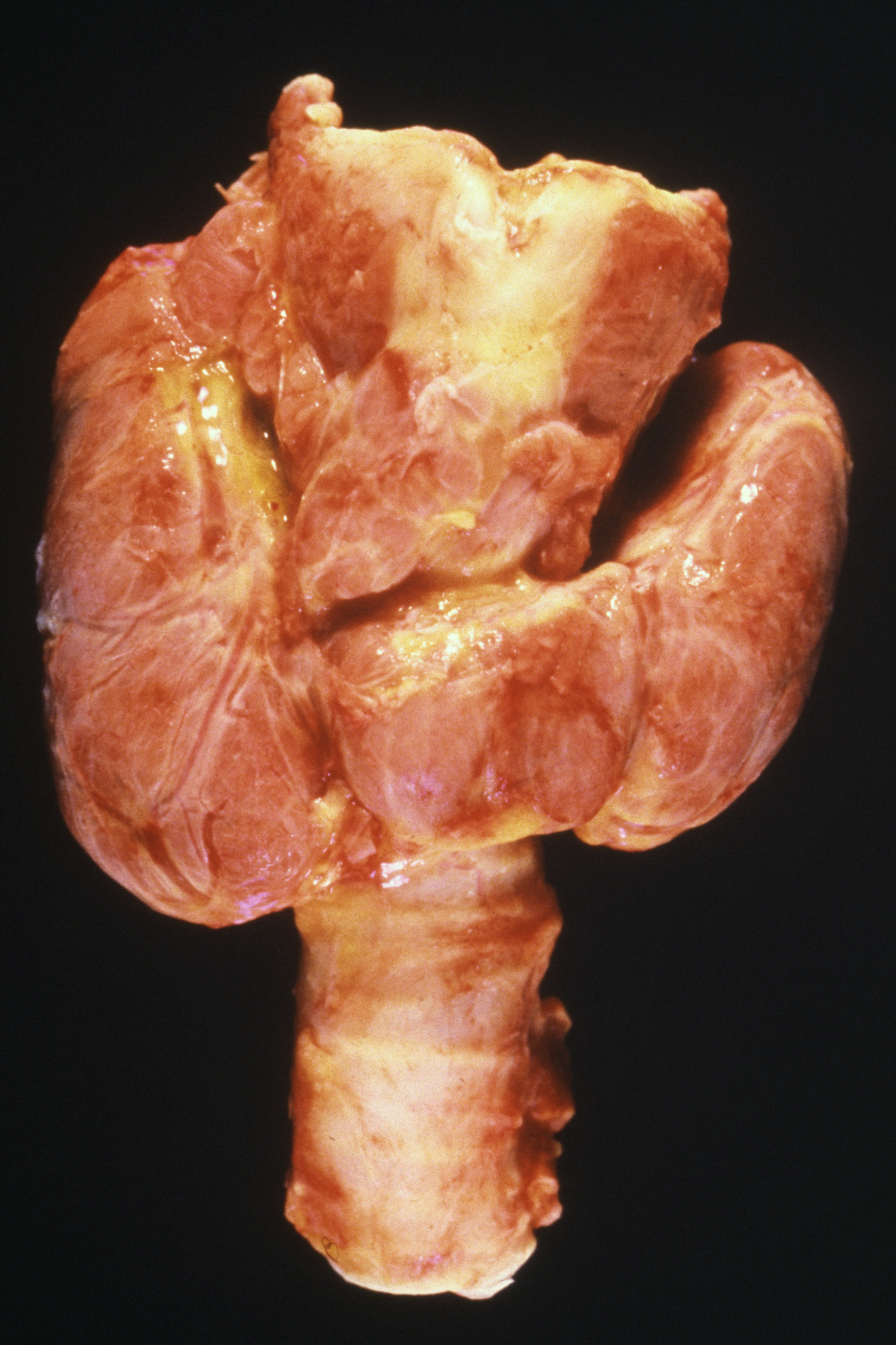
- Diffuse hyperplasia of the thyroid
- Specialty: Endocrinology
- Causes: Iodine deficiency, autoimmune disease, tumors, cyanide poisoning

A goitre (British English) or goiter (American English) is a swelling in the neck resulting from an enlarged thyroid gland. A goitre can be associated with a thyroid that is not functioning properly.

Worldwide, over 90% of goitre cases are caused by iodine deficiency. The term is from the Latin gutturia, meaning throat. Most goitres are not cancerous (i.e., benign), though they may be potentially harmful. Women are affected more often than men.

== Signs and symptoms ==
A goitre can present as a palpable or visible enlargement of the thyroid gland at the base of the neck. A goitre, if associated with hypothyroidism or hyperthyroidism, may be present with symptoms of the underlying disorder. For hyperthyroidism, the most common symptoms are associated with adrenergic stimulation: tachycardia (increased heart rate), palpitations, nervousness, tremor, increased blood pressure and heat intolerance. Clinical manifestations are often related to hypermetabolism (increased metabolism), excessive thyroid hormone, an increase in oxygen consumption, metabolic changes in protein metabolism, immunologic stimulation of diffuse goitre, and ocular changes (exophthalmos). Hypothyroid people commonly have poor appetite, cold intolerance, constipation, lethargy and may undergo weight gain. However, these symptoms are often non-specific and make diagnosis difficult.

According to the WHO classification of goitre by palpation, the severity of goitre is currently graded as grade 0, grade 1, grade 2.

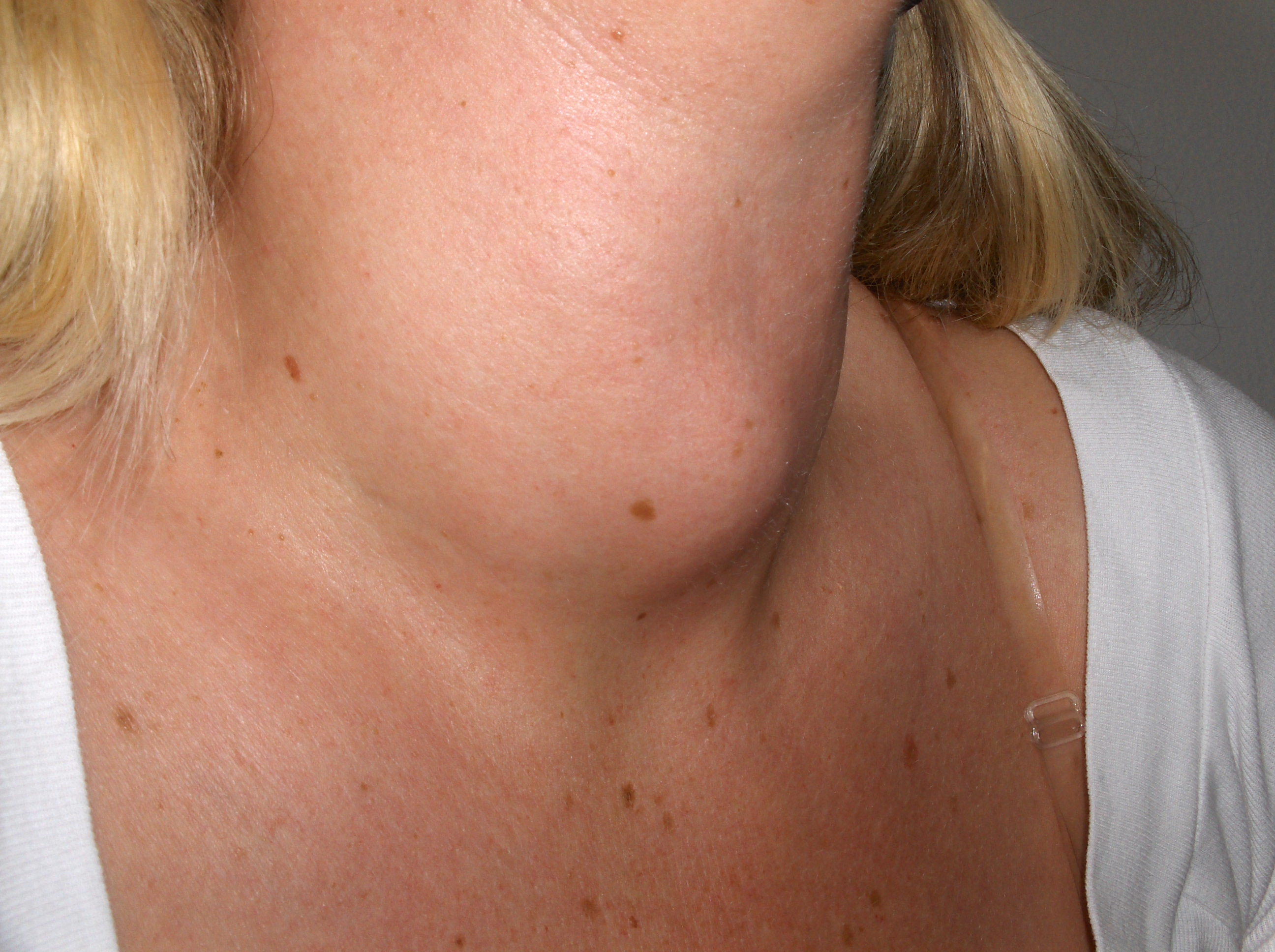
Goitre Class II, WHO grade 2

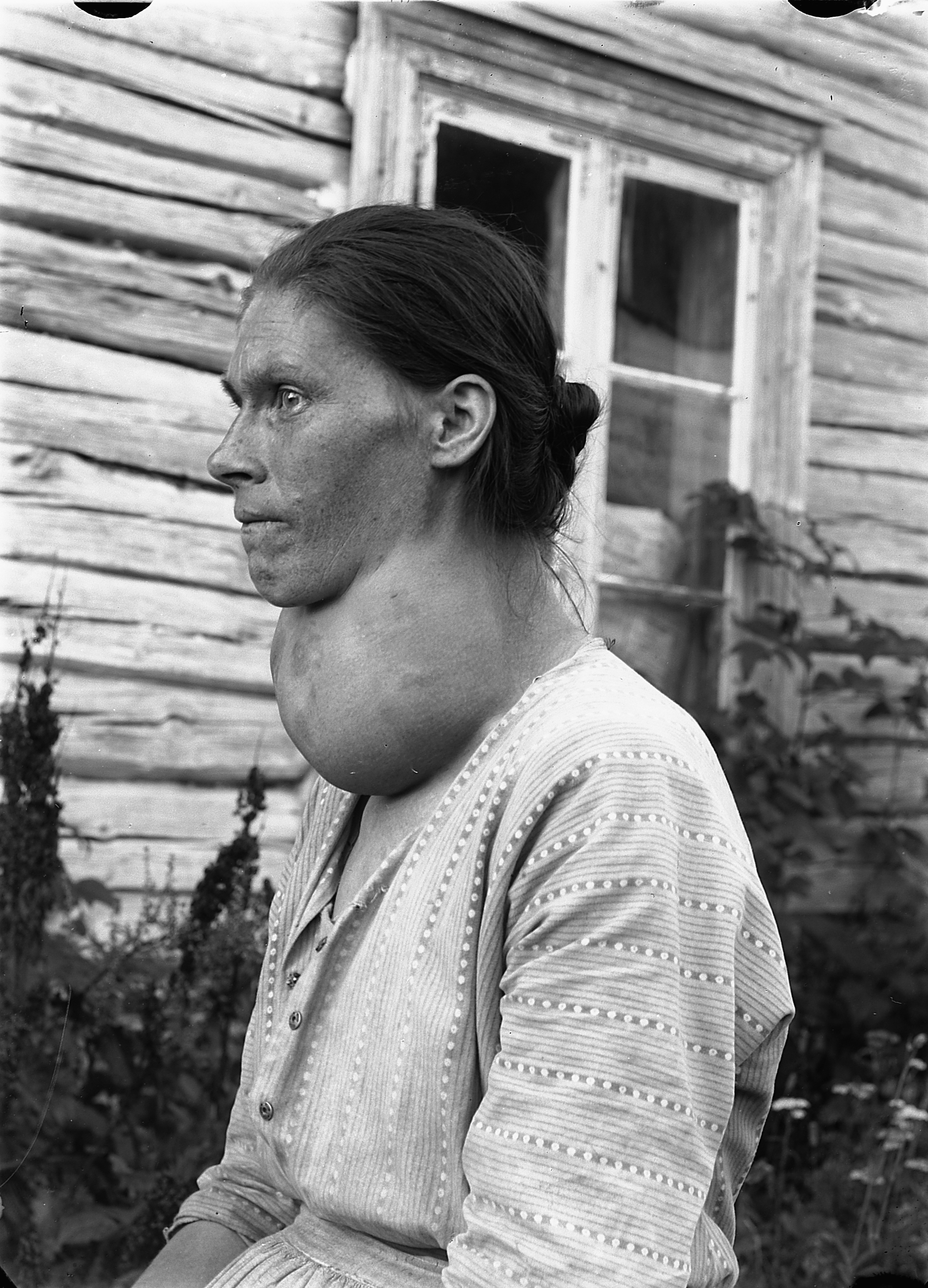
Goitre Class III, WHO grade 2

== Causes ==
Worldwide, the most common cause for goitre is iodine deficiency, commonly seen in countries that scarcely use iodised salt. Selenium deficiency is also considered a contributing factor. In countries that use iodised salt, Hashimoto's thyroiditis is the most common cause. Goitre can also result from cyanide poisoning, which is particularly common in tropical countries where people eat the cyanide-rich cassava root as the staple food.

Cause	Pathophysiology	Resultant thyroid activity	Growth pattern	Treatment	Incidence and prevalence	Prognosis
Iodine deficiency	Hyperplasia of thyroid to compensate for decreased efficacy	Can cause hypothyroidism	Diffuse	Iodine	Constitutes over 90% cases of goitre worldwide	Increased size of thyroid may be permanent if untreated for around five years
Congenital hypothyroidism	Inborn errors of thyroid hormone synthesis	Hypothyroidism				
Goitrogen ingestion						
Adverse drug reactions						
Hashimoto's thyroiditis	Autoimmune disease in which the thyroid gland is gradually destroyed. Infiltration of lymphocytes.	Hypothyroidism	Diffuse and lobulated	Thyroid hormone replacement	Prevalence: 1 to 1.5 in a 1000	Remission with treatment
Pituitary disease	Hypersecretion of thyroid stimulating hormone, almost always by a pituitary adenoma		Diffuse	Pituitary surgery	Very rare	
Graves' disease—also called Basedow syndrome	Autoantibodies (TSHR-Ab) that activate the TSH-receptor (TSHR)	Hyperthyroidism	Diffuse	Antithyroid agents, radioiodine, surgery	Will develop in about 0.5% of males and 3% of females	Remission with treatment, but still lower quality of life for 14 to 21 years after treatment, with lower mood and lower vitality, regardless of the choice of treatment
Thyroiditis	Acute or chronic inflammation	Can be hyperthyroidism initially, but progress to hypothyroidism				
Thyroid cancer			Usually uninodular			Overall relative 5-year survival rate of 85% for females and 74% for males
Benign thyroid neoplasms		Usually hyperthyroidism	Usually uninodular			Mostly harmless
Thyroid hormone insensitivity		Secretional hyperthyroidism, Symptomatic hypothyroidism	Diffuse			

- Sarcoidosis
- Amyloidosis
- Hydatidiform mole
- Cysts
- Acromegaly
- Pendred syndrome

== Diagnosis ==
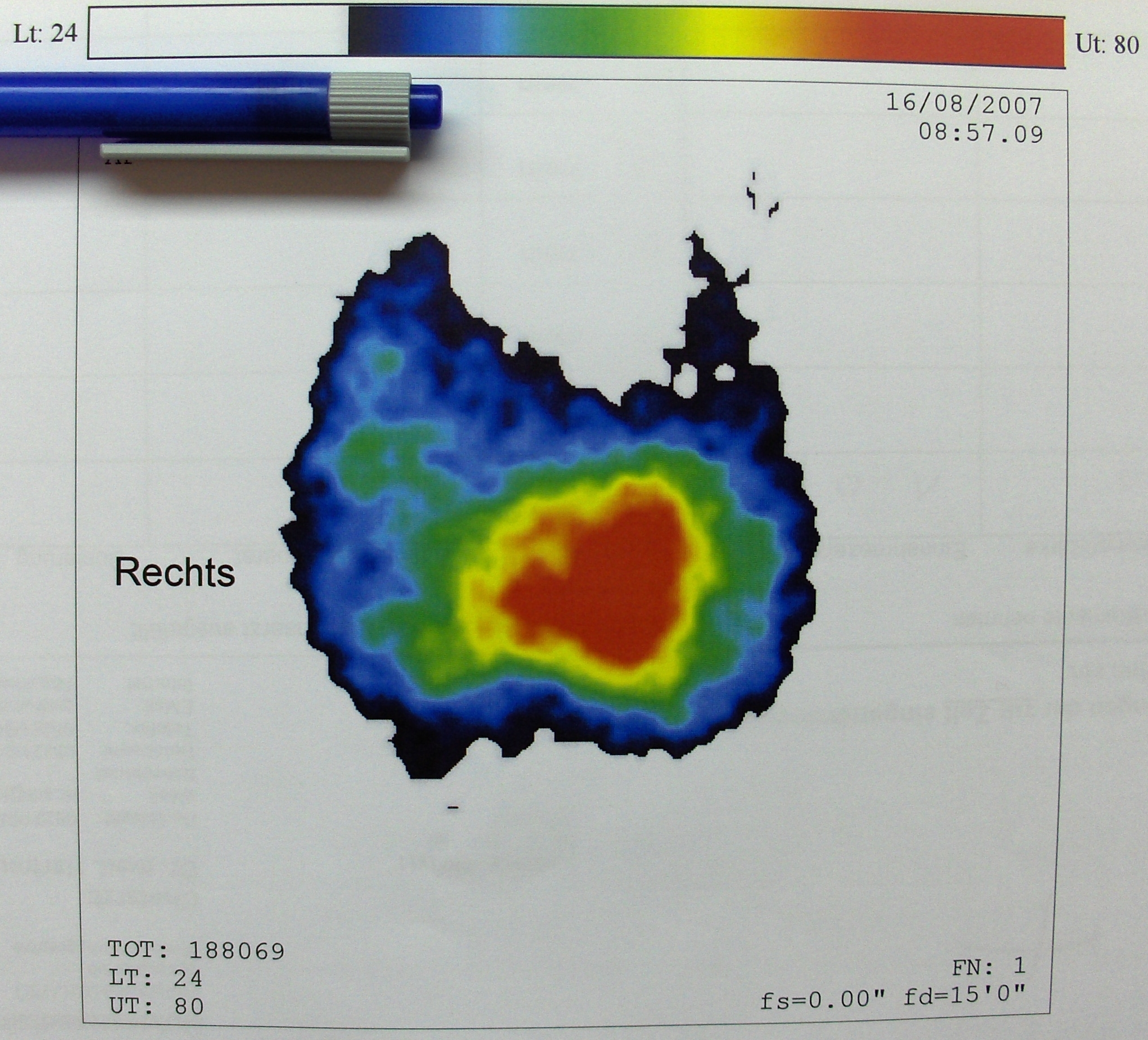
Goitre with toxic adenoma

Goitre may be diagnosed via a thyroid function test.

=== Types ===
A goitre may be classified either as nodular or diffuse. Nodular goitres are either of one nodule (uninodular) or of multiple nodules (multinodular). Multinodular goitre is the most common disorder of the thyroid gland.

Growth pattern

- Uninodular goitre: one thyroid nodule; can be either inactive, or active (toxic) – autonomously producing thyroid hormone.
- Multinodular goitre: multiple nodules; can likewise be inactive or toxic, the latter is called toxic multinodular goitre and associated with hyperthyroidism. These nodules grow up at varying rates and secrete thyroid hormone autonomously, thereby suppressing TSH-dependent growth and function in the rest of gland. Inactive nodules in the same goitre can be malignant. Thyroid cancer is identified in 13.7% of the patients operated for multinodular goitre.
- Diffuse goitre: the whole thyroid appearing to be enlarged due to hyperplasia.

Size

- Class I: the goitre in normal posture of the head cannot be seen; it is only found by palpation.
- Class II: the goitre is palpable and can be easily seen.
- Class III: the goitre is very large and is retrosternal (partially or totally lying below the sternum), pressure results in compression marks.

== Treatment ==
Goitre is treated according to the cause. If the thyroid gland is producing an excess of thyroid hormones (T3 and T4), radioactive iodine is given to the patient to shrink the gland. If goitre is caused by iodine deficiency, small doses of iodide in the form of Lugol's iodine or KI solution are given. If the goitre is associated with an underactive thyroid, thyroid supplements are used as treatment. Sometimes a partial or complete thyroidectomy is required.

== Medical and scientific developments ==
The discovery of iodine's importance in thyroid function and its role in preventing goitre marked a significant medical breakthrough. The introduction of iodised salt in the early 20th century became a key public health initiative, effectively reducing the prevalence of goitre in previously affected regions. This measure was one of the earliest and most successful examples of mass preventive health campaigns.

== Epidemiology ==
Disability-adjusted life year for iodine deficiency per 100,000 inhabitants in 2002: No data <50 50–100 100–150 150–200 200–250 250–300 300–350 350–400 400–450 450–500 500–800 >800

Goitre is more common among women, but this includes the many types of goitre caused by autoimmune problems, and not only those caused by simple lack of iodine.

Iodine mainly accumulates in the sea and in the topsoil. Before iodine enrichment programs, goitres were common in areas with repeated flooding or glacial activities, which erodes the topsoil. It is endemic in populations where the intake of iodine is less than 10 μg per day.

Examples of such regions include the alpine regions of Southern Europe (such as Switzerland), the Himalayans, and the Great Lakes basin. As reported in 1923, all the domestic animals had goitre in some of the glacial valleys of Southern Alaska, so severely in Pemberton Meadows that it was difficult to raise young animals there.

== History ==
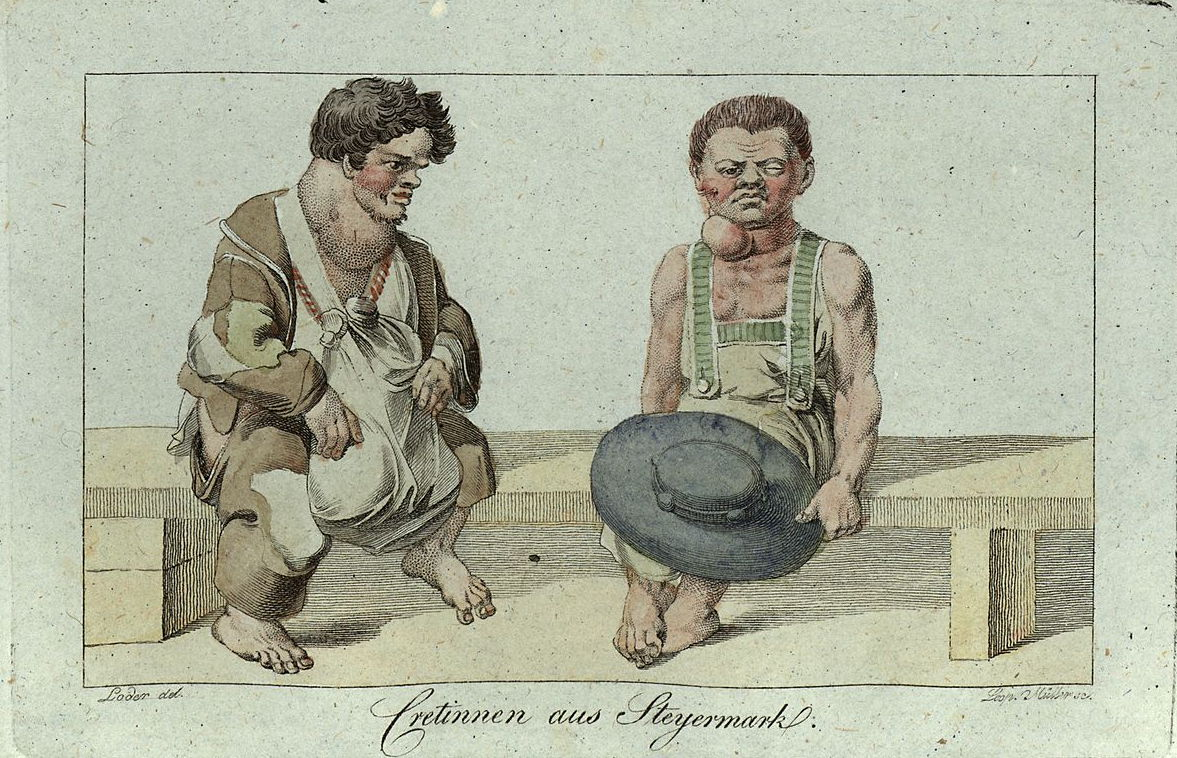
Goitre and congenital iodine deficiency syndrome in Styria, copper engraving, 1815

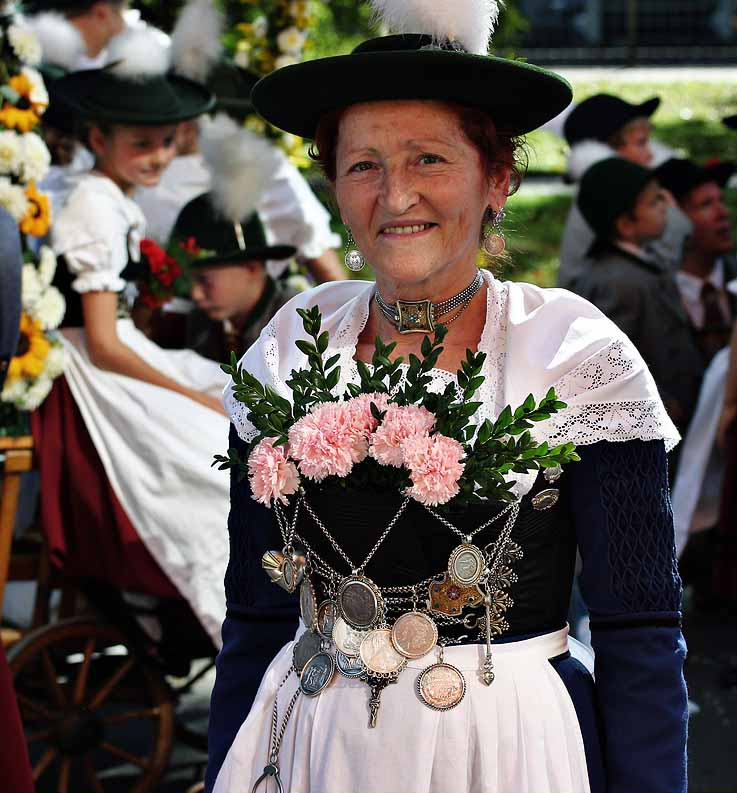
Woman in Miesbacher Tracht wearing a goitre choker

Chinese physicians of the Tang dynasty (618–907) were the first to successfully treat patients with goitre by using the iodine-rich thyroid gland of animals such as sheep and pigs—in raw, pill, or powdered form. This was outlined in Zhen Quan's (d. 643 AD) book, as well as several others. One Chinese book, The Pharmacopoeia of the Heavenly Husbandman, asserted that iodine-rich sargassum was used to treat goitre patients by the 1st century BC, but this book was written much later.

In the 12th century, Zayn al-Din al-Jurjani, a Persian physician, provided the first description of Graves' disease after noting the association of goitre and a displacement of the eye known as exophthalmos in his Thesaurus of the Shah of Khwarazm, the major medical dictionary of its time. The disease was later named after Irish doctor Robert James Graves, who described a case of goitre with exophthalmos in 1835. The German Karl Adolph von Basedow also independently reported the same constellation of symptoms in 1840, while earlier reports of the disease were also published by the Italians Giuseppe Flajani and Antonio Giuseppe Testa, in 1802 and 1810 respectively, and by the English physician Caleb Hillier Parry (a friend of Edward Jenner) in the late 18th century.

Paracelsus (1493–1541) was the first person to propose a relationship between goitre and minerals (particularly lead) in drinking water. Iodine was later discovered by Bernard Courtois in 1811 from seaweed ash.

Goitre was previously common in many areas that were deficient in iodine in the soil. For example, in the English Midlands, the condition was known as Derbyshire Neck. In the United States, goitre was found in the Appalachian, Great Lakes, Midwest, and Intermountain regions. The condition is now practically absent in affluent nations, where table salt is supplemented with iodine. However, it is still prevalent in India, China, Central Asia, and Central Africa.

Goitre had been prevalent in the alpine countries for a long time. Switzerland reduced the condition by introducing iodised salt in 1922. Bavarian folk dress (tracht) worn in the Miesbach and Salzburg regions, which appeared in the 19th century, includes a choker, dubbed Kropfband (struma band), which was used to hide either the goitre or the remnants of goitre surgery.

In various regions around the world, particularly in mountainous areas, the prevalence of goitre was linked to iodine deficiency in the diet. For example, the Alps, the Himalayas, and the Andes had high rates of goitre due to the iodine-poor soil. In these regions, iodine deficiency led to widespread hormonal imbalances, particularly affecting thyroid function.

== Society and culture ==
In the 1920s wearing bottles of iodine around the neck was believed to prevent goitre.

=== Notable cases ===
- Former U.S. President George H. W. Bush and his wife Barbara Bush were both diagnosed with Graves' disease and goitres, within two years of each other. The disease caused hyperthyroidism and cardiac dysrhythmia. Scientists said that, absent an environmental cause, the odds of both a husband and wife having Graves' disease might be 1 in 100,000 or as low as 1 in 3,000,000.

=== Heraldry ===
The coat of arms and crest of Die Kröpfner, of Tyrol, showed a man "afflicted with a large goitre", an apparent pun on the German for the word ("Kropf").

=== Social Impacts ===
In some historical contexts, goitres were so prevalent that they became normalized within the culture. For instance, in certain Alpine regions, large goitres were sometimes considered a sign of beauty. Conversely, in other areas, individuals with goitres faced social stigma, which could lead to marginalisation and discrimination.

=== Art ===
Goitres have been discussed in art-historical and medical-historical literature as recurring features in painting and religious portraiture. A review by Accorona et al. described thyroid swelling as a phenomenon represented across multiple artistic periods, while other authors have examined its appearance in Renaissance art more specifically. A review by Joselv Albano and Janelle Lara Mirhan specifically focused on the representation of goitre in the depictions of Susanna and the Elders.

== See also ==
- David Marine conducted substantial research on the treatment of goitre with iodine.
- Endemic goitre
- Struma ovarii—a kind of teratoma
- Thyroid hormone receptor
