= Struma ovarii =

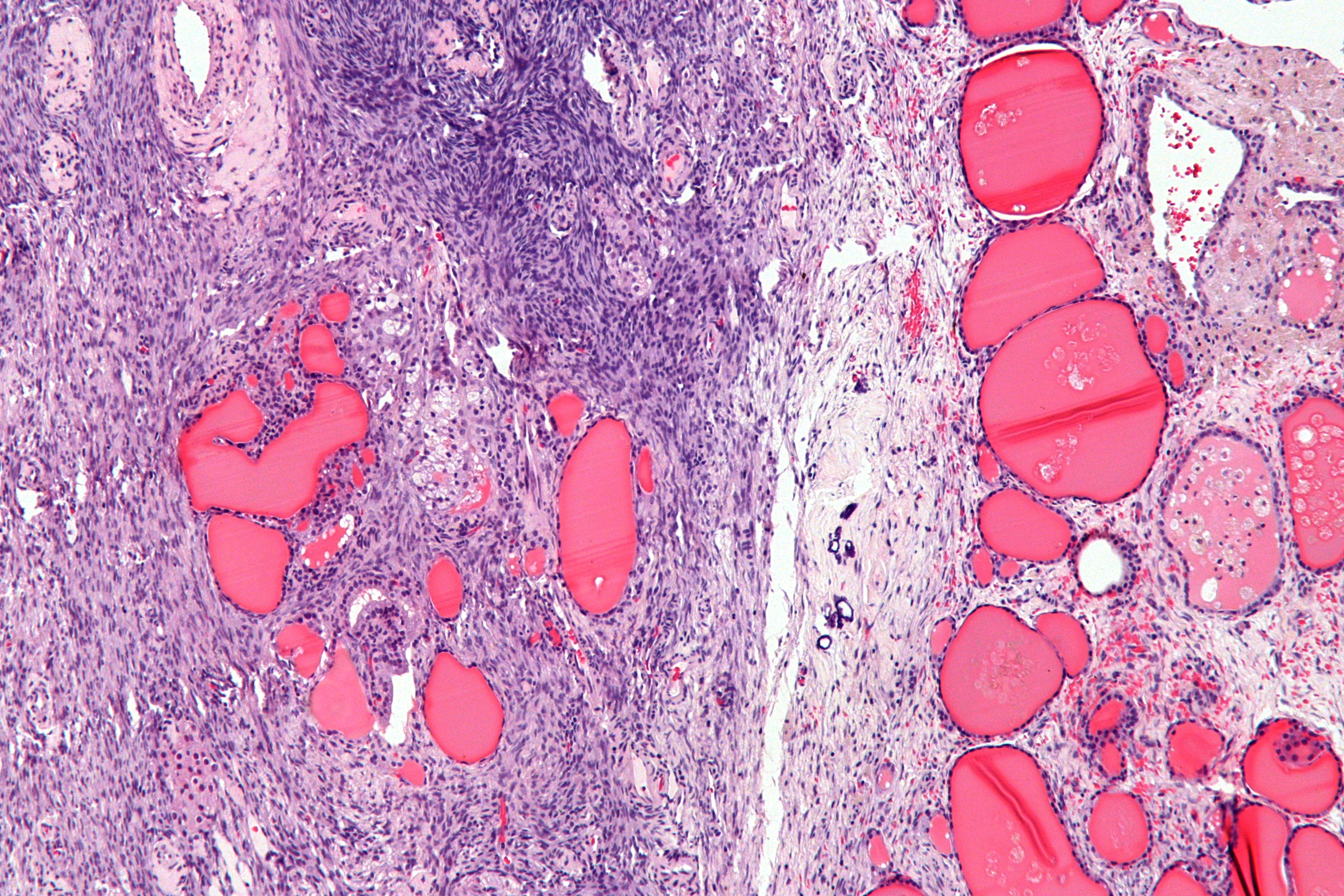
- Micrograph of a struma ovarii. Characteristic thyroid follicles are seen on the right, and ovarian stroma on the left. H&E stain.
- Specialty: Oncology

A struma ovarii (literally: goitre of the ovary) is a rare form of monodermal teratoma that contains mostly thyroid tissue, which may cause hyperthyroidism.

Despite its name, struma ovarii is not restricted to the ovary.

The vast majority of struma ovarii are benign tumours; however, malignant tumours of this type are found in a small percentage of cases.

== Radiologic findings ==
The ultrasound features of struma ovarii are nonspecific, but a heterogeneous, predominantly solid mass may be seen. Ultrasound demonstrates a complex appearance with multiple cystic and solid areas, findings that reflect the gross pathologic appearance of the tumor.

Magnetic resonance imaging (MRI) findings may be more characteristic: The cystic spaces demonstrate both high and low signal intensity on T1- and T2-weighted images. Some of the cystic spaces may demonstrate low signal intensity on both T1- and T2-weighted images due to the thick, gelatinous colloid of the struma. No fat is evident in these lesions.

== Additional images ==
Low magnification

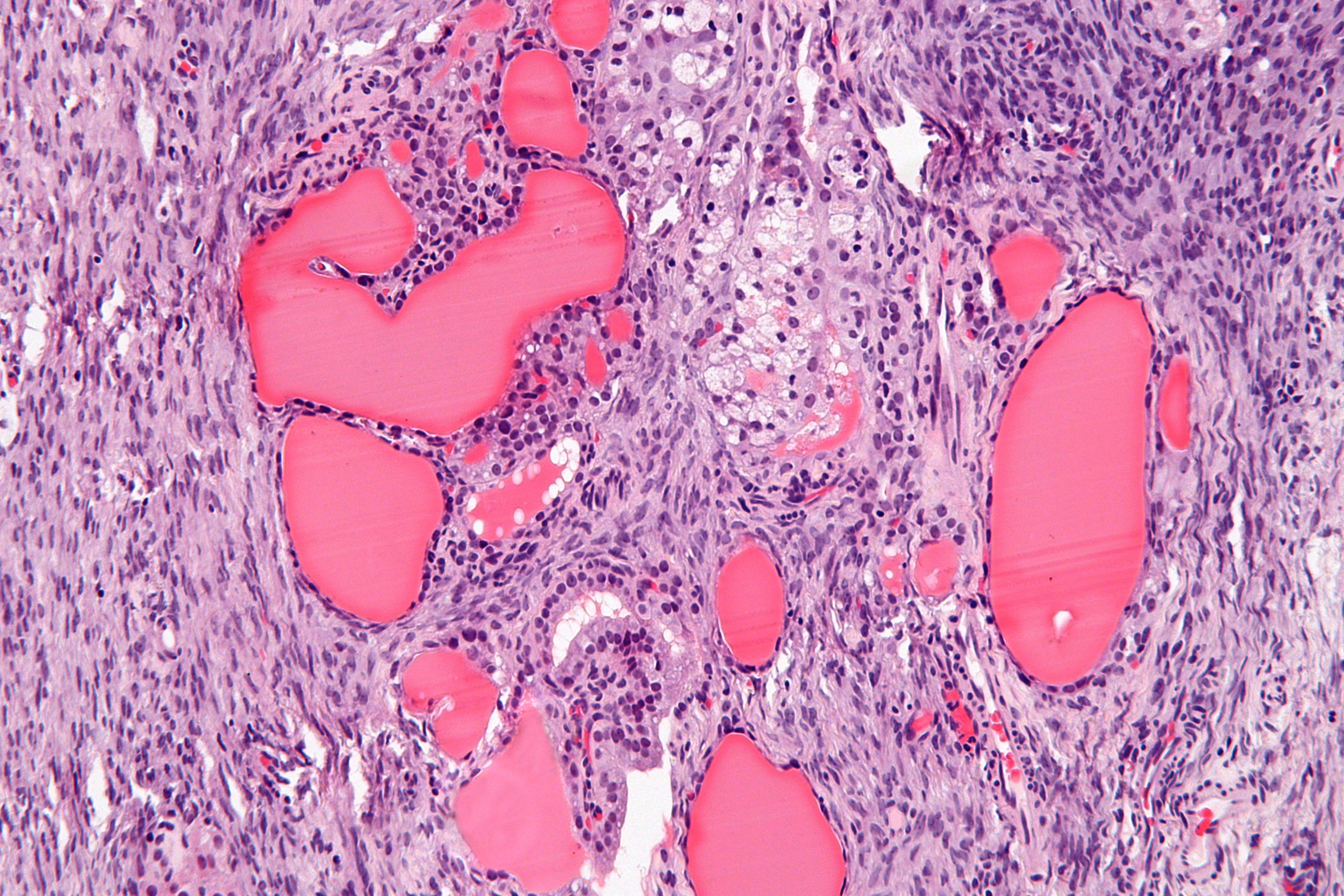
Higher magnification

== See also ==
- Strumal carcinoid
- Teratoma
