= Strumal carcinoid =

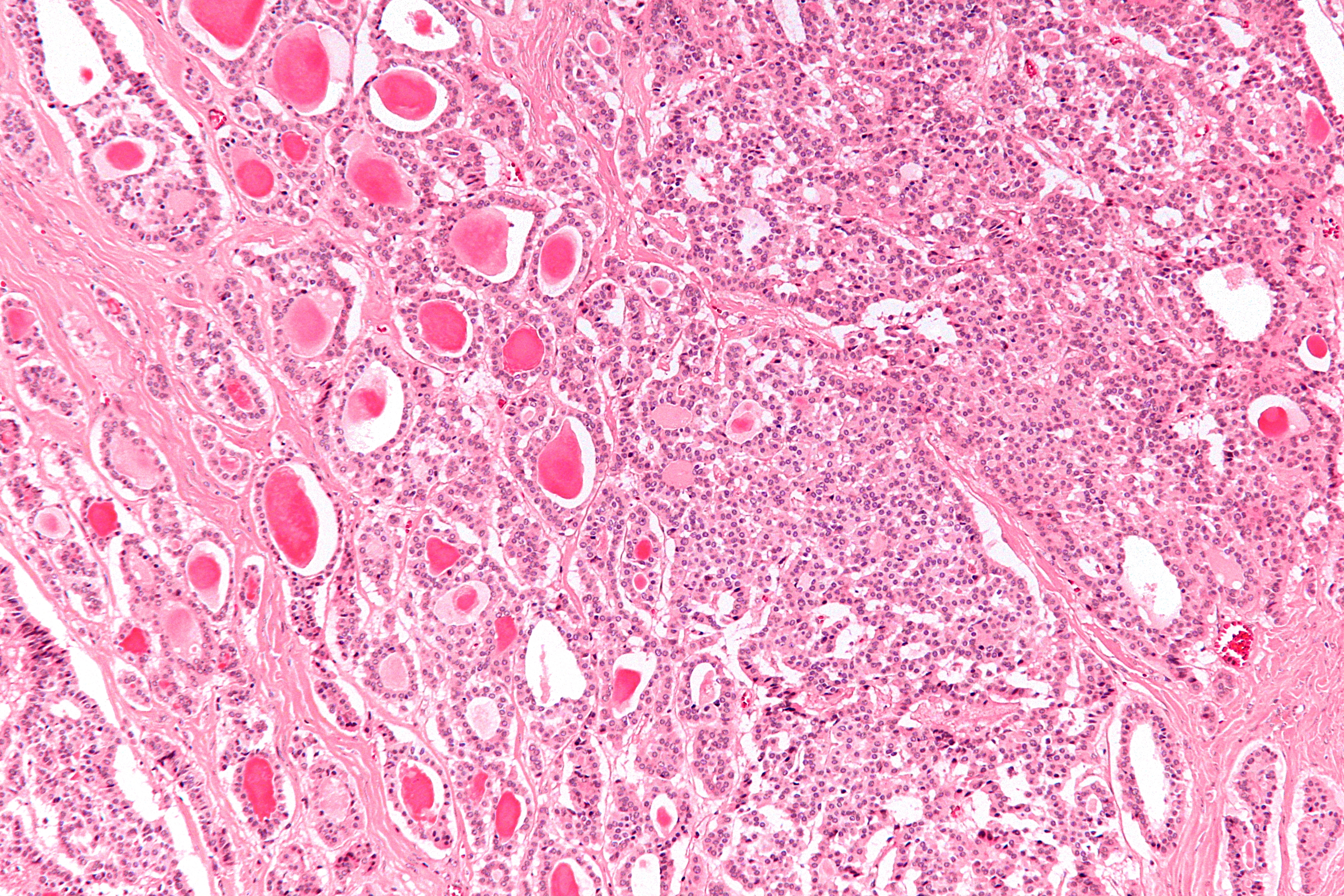
- Micrograph of a strumal carcinoid. H&E stain.

The strumal carcinoid is a type of monodermal teratoma with histomorphologic features of (1) the thyroid gland and (2) a neuroendocrine tumour (carcinoid).

== See also ==
- Struma ovarii
- Teratoma
