= Congenital hypothyroidism due to iodine deficiency =

Impaired physical and mental development due to insufficient iodine intake

Congenital iodine deficiency syndrome
- Other names: Endemic cretinism
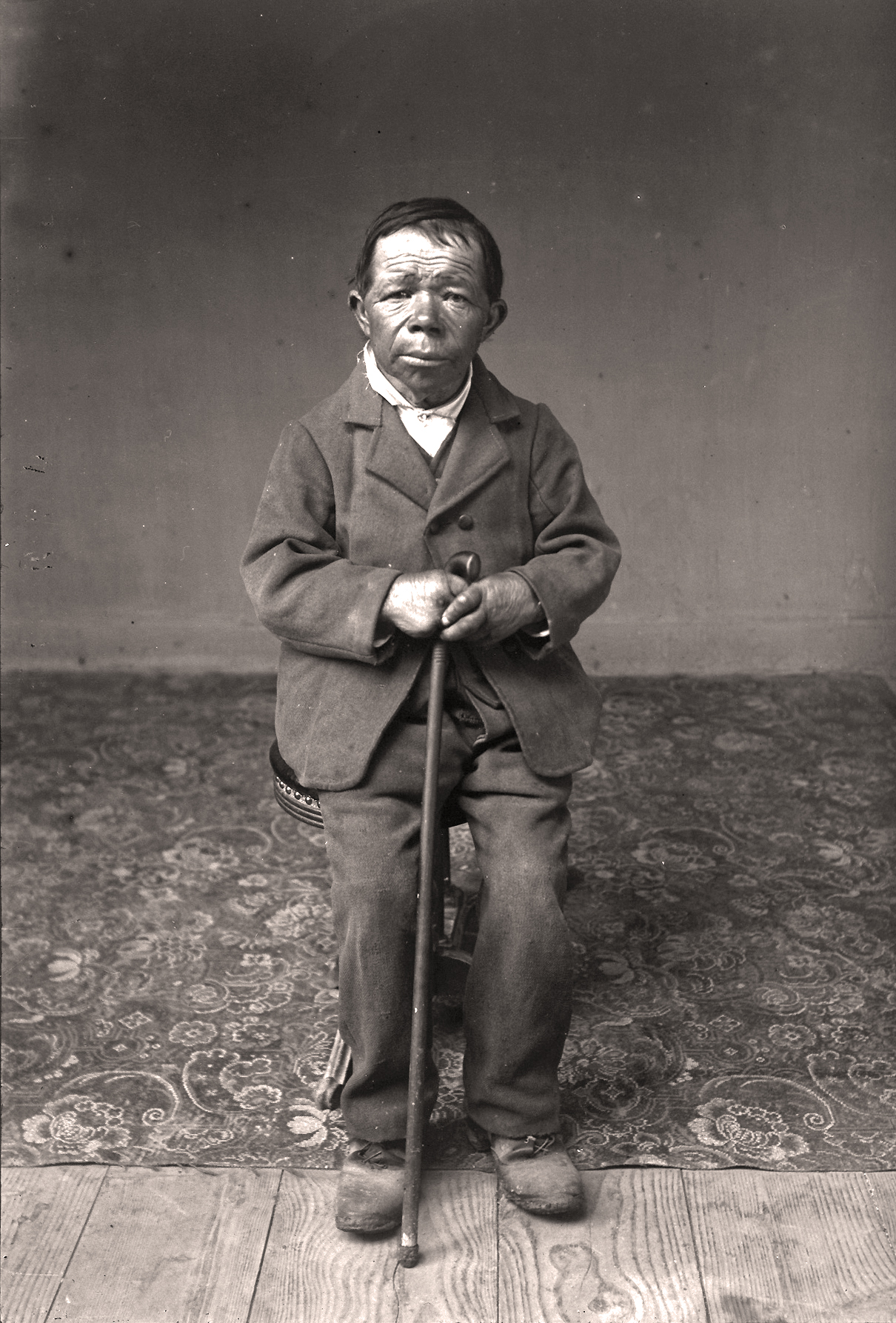
- A man with congenital iodine deficiency syndrome
- Specialty: Endocrinology
- Symptoms: Goiter, mental impairment, poor growth, infertility, hair loss

Congenital hypothyroidism due to iodine deficiency (ICD-11), or congenital iodine deficiency syndrome (CIDS, ICD-10), is a medical condition present at birth marked by impaired physical and mental development, due to insufficient thyroid hormone production (hypothyroidism) caused by insufficient dietary iodine during pregnancy. Iodine deficiency is one cause of underactive thyroid function at birth, called congenital hypothyroidism. Consistent with the broader category of congenital hypothyroidism, this subtype also manifests as what was historically termed cretinism if left untreated.

Symptoms may include goiter, poor length growth in infants, reduced adult stature, thickened skin, hair loss, enlarged tongue, a protruding abdomen, delayed bone maturation and puberty in children, mental deterioration, neurological impairment, impeded ovulation, and infertility in adults.

In developed countries, thyroid function testing of newborns has assured that in those affected, treatment with the synthetic thyroid hormone thyroxine is begun promptly. This screening and treatment successfully cures the disease.

== Signs and symptoms ==
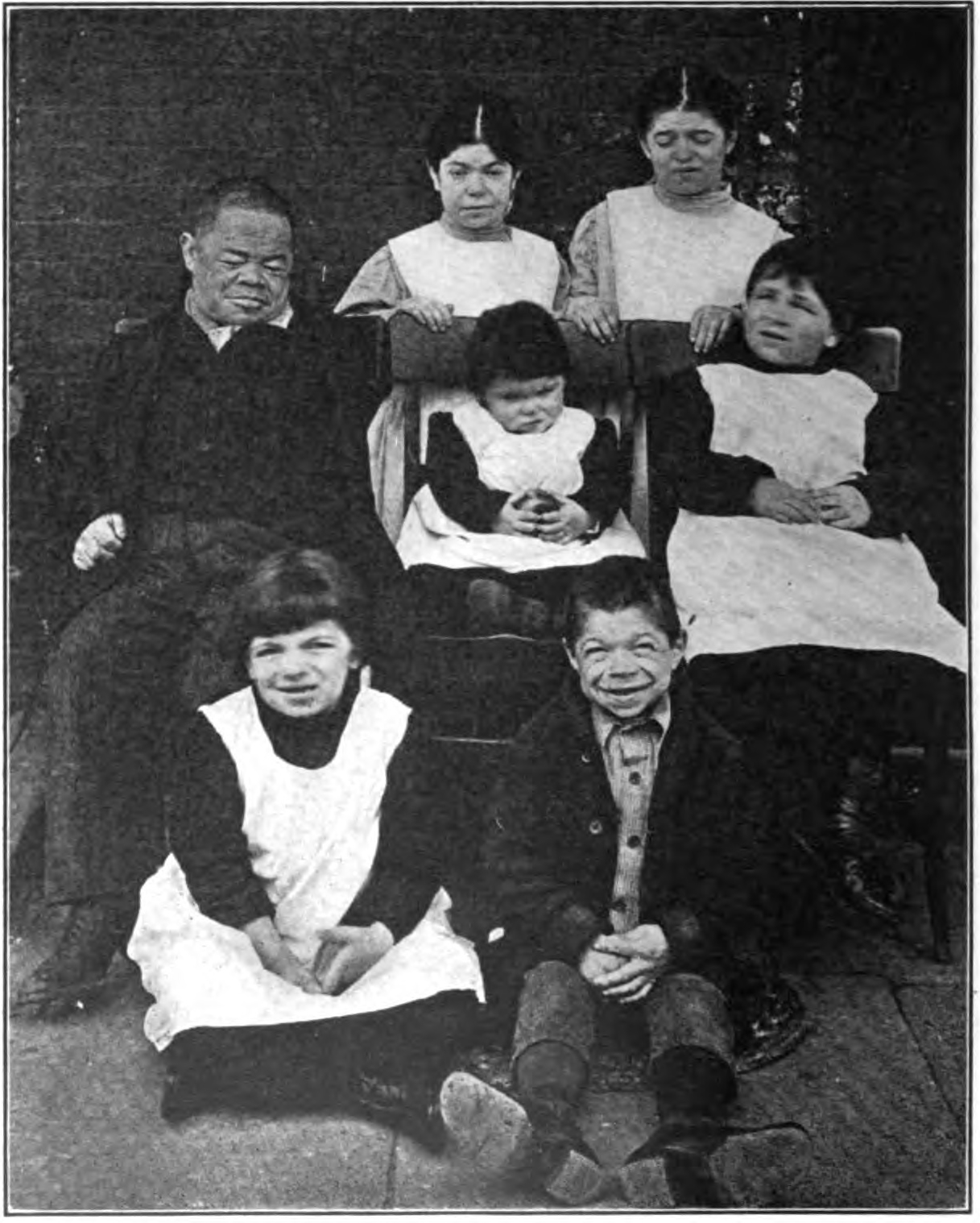
Group of men and women of various ages with CIDS

Iodine deficiency causes gradual enlargement of the thyroid gland, referred to as a goiter. Poor length growth is apparent as early as the first year of life. Adult stature without treatment ranges from 100 to 160 cm (3 ft 3 in to 5 ft 3 in), depending on severity, sex, and other genetic factors. Other signs include thickened skin, hair loss, enlarged tongue, and a protruding abdomen. In children, bone maturation and puberty are severely delayed. In adults, ovulation is impeded and infertility is common.

Mental deterioration is common. Neurological impairment may be mild, with reduced muscle tone and motor coordination, or so severe that the person cannot stand or walk. Cognitive impairment may also range from mild to so severe that the person is nonverbal and dependent on others for basic care. Thought and reflexes are slower.

== Cause ==
Disability-adjusted life years (DALY) lost from iodine deficiency in 2012 in proportion to a million people 52–163 181–217 221–221 222–310 320–505 512–610 626–626 653–976 984–1,242 1,251–3,159

Around the world, the most common cause of congenital iodine deficiency syndrome (endemic cretinism) is dietary iodine deficiency.

Iodine is an essential trace element, necessary for the synthesis of thyroid hormones. Iodine deficiency is the most common preventable cause of neonatal and childhood brain damage worldwide. Although iodine is found in many foods, it is not universally present in all soils in adequate amounts. Most iodine, in iodide form, is in the oceans, where the iodide ions are reduced to elemental iodine, which then enters the atmosphere and falls to earth in rain, introducing iodine to soils. Soil deficient in iodine is most common inland, in mountainous areas, and in areas of frequent flooding. It can also occur in coastal regions, where iodine might have been removed from the soil by glaciation, as well as leaching by snow, water and heavy rainfall. Plants and animals grown in iodine-deficient soils are correspondingly deficient. Populations living in those areas without outside food sources are most at risk of iodine deficiency diseases.

== Diagnosis ==
=== Differential diagnosis ===
Dwarfism may also be caused by malnutrition or other hormonal deficiencies, such as insufficient growth hormone secretion, hypopituitarism, decreased secretion of growth hormone-releasing hormone, deficient growth hormone receptor activity and downstream causes, such as insulin-like growth factor 1 (IGF-1) deficiency.

== Prevention ==
There are public health campaigns in many countries which involve iodine administration. As of December 2019, 122 countries have mandatory iodine food fortification programs.

== Treatment ==
Congenital iodine deficiency has been almost eliminated in developed countries through iodine supplementation of food and by newborn screening using a blood test for thyroid function.

Treatment consists of lifelong administration of thyroxine (T4). Thyroxine must be dosed as tablets only, even to newborns, as the liquid oral suspensions and compounded forms cannot be depended on for reliable dosing. For infants, the T4 tablets are generally crushed and mixed with breast milk, formula milk or water. If the medication is mixed with formulas containing iron or soya products, larger doses may be required, as these substances may alter the absorption of thyroid hormone from the gut. Monitoring TSH blood levels every 2–3 weeks during the first months of life is recommended to ensure that affected infants are at the high end of normal range.

== History ==
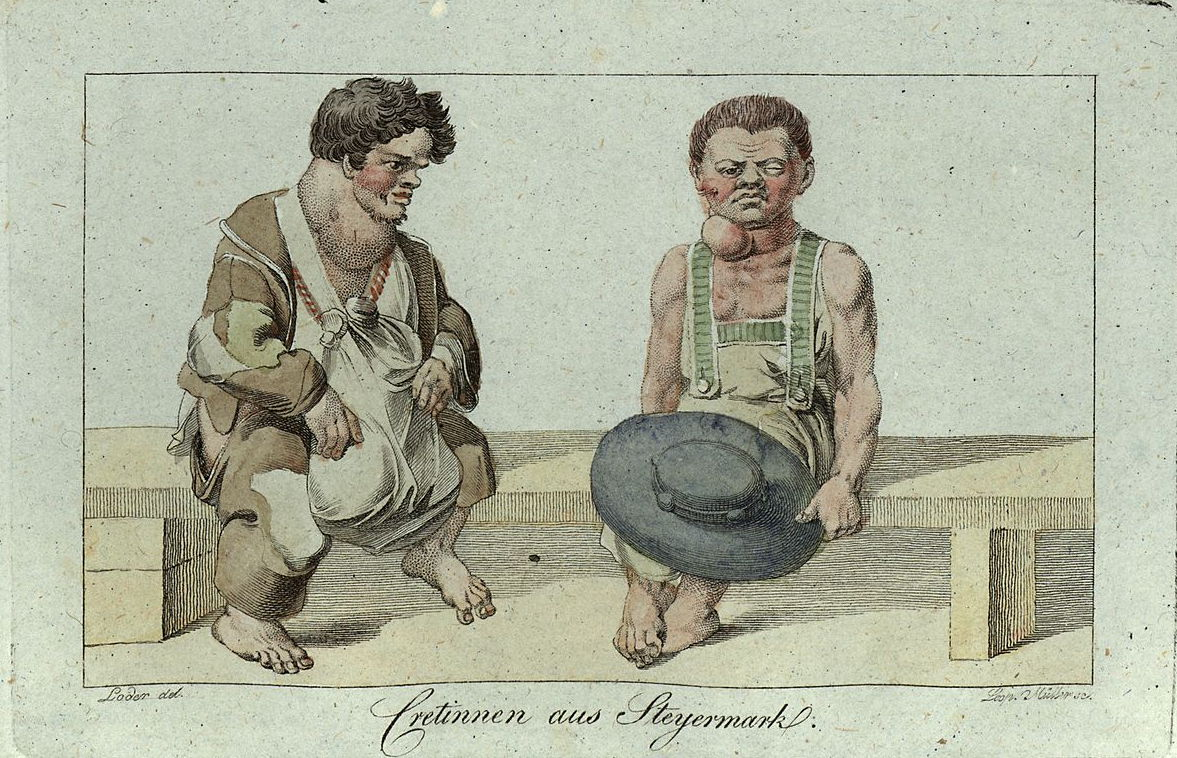
Cretinism (Styria), copper engraving, 1815

Congenital iodine-deficiency syndrome was especially common in areas of southern Europe around the Alps and was often described by ancient Roman writers and depicted by artists. The earliest Alpine mountain climbers sometimes came upon whole villages affected by it. The prevalence of the condition was described from a medical perspective by several travellers and physicians in the late 18th and early 19th centuries. At that time the cause was not known and it was often attributed to "stagnant air" in mountain valleys or "bad water". The proportion of people affected varied markedly throughout southern Europe and even within very small areas; it might be common in one valley and not another. The number of severely affected persons was always a minority, and most persons were only affected to the extent of having a goitre and some degree of reduced cognition and growth. The majority of such cases were still socially functional in their pastoral villages.

More mildly affected areas of Europe and North America in the 19th century were referred to as "goitre belts". The degree of iodine deficiency was milder and manifested primarily as thyroid enlargement rather than severe mental and physical impairment. In Switzerland, for example, where soil does not contain a large amount of iodine, cases of congenital iodine deficiency syndrome were very abundant and even considered genetically caused. As the variety of food sources dramatically increased in Europe and North America and the populations became less completely dependent on locally grown food, the prevalence of endemic goitre diminished. This is supported by a 1979 WHO publication which concluded that "changes in the origin of food supplies may account for the otherwise unexplained disappearance of endemic goitre from a number of localities during the past 50 years".

The early 20th century saw the discovery of the relationships of neurological impairment with hypothyroidism due to iodine deficiency. Both have been largely eliminated in the developed world.

== Terminology ==
The term cretin was originally used to describe a person affected by this condition, but, as with words such as spastic and lunatic, it underwent pejoration and is now considered derogatory and inappropriate. Cretin became a medical term in the 18th century, from an Occitan and a Franco-Provencal expression, prevalent in a region where persons with such a condition were especially common (see below); it saw wide medical use in the 19th and early 20th centuries, and was a "tick box" category on Victorian-era census forms in the UK. The term spread more widely in popular English as a markedly derogatory term for a person who behaves stupidly. Because of its pejorative connotations in popular speech, current usage among health care professionals has abandoned the noun "cretin" referring to a person. The noun cretinism, referring to the condition, still occurs in medical literature and textbooks but its use is waning.

The etymology of cretin is uncertain. Several hypotheses exist. The most common derivation provided in English dictionaries is from the Franco-Provencal pronunciation of the word Crestin/Creitin ("Christian"), which was a greeting there. According to the Oxford English Dictionary, the translation of the term into "human creature" implies that the label "Christian" is a reminder of the humanity of the affected, in contrast to brute beasts. Other sources suggest that Christian describes the person's "Christ-like" inability to sin, stemming, in such cases, from an incapacity to distinguish right from wrong.

Other speculative etymologies have been offered:

- From creta, Latin for chalk, because of the pallor of those affected.
- From cretira, Grison-Romanche creature, from Latin creatus.
- From cretine, French for alluvium (soil deposited by flowing water), an allusion to the condition's suspected origin in inadequate soil.

== See also ==
- Moron (psychology)
