= Congenital hypothyroidism =

Thyroid hormone deficiency present at birth

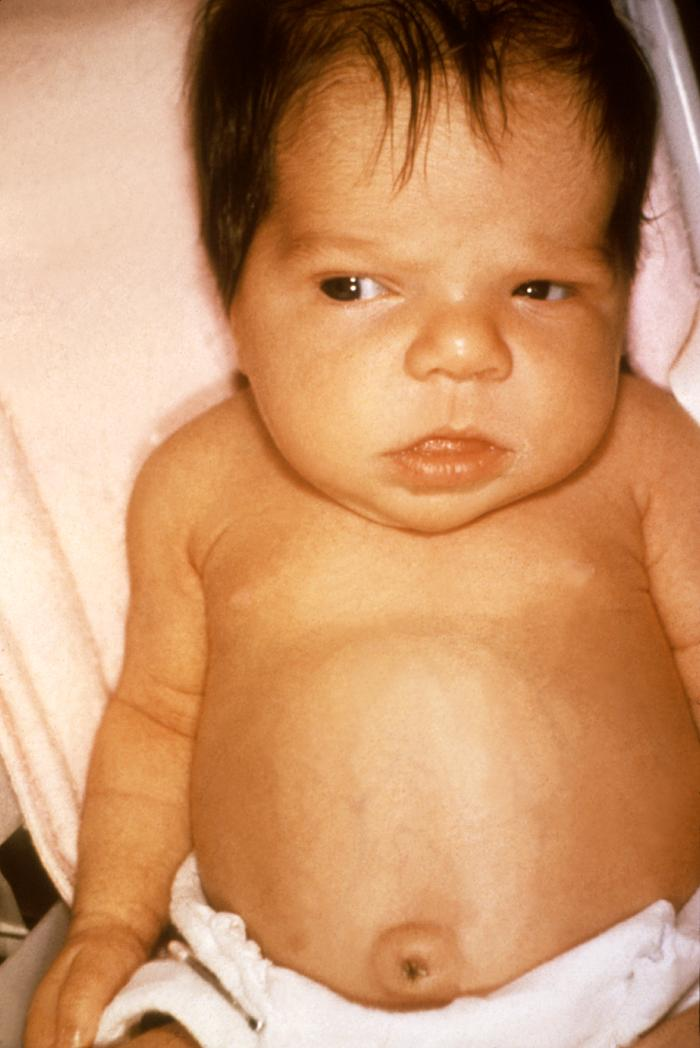
- 6 week old female with jaundice due to hypothyroidism.
- Specialty: Endocrinology

Congenital hypothyroidism (CH) is a thyroid hormone deficiency present at birth. If untreated soon after birth, severe congenital hypothyroidism can lead to growth failure and permanent intellectual disability. Untreated congenital hypothyroidism is also referred to as cretinism. Infants born with congenital hypothyroidism may be asymptomatic, or may display mild symptoms that go unrecognized as a problem. Significant deficiency may cause excessive sleeping, reduced interest in nursing, poor muscle tone, low or hoarse cry, infrequent bowel movements, significant jaundice, and low body temperature.

Causes of congenital hypothyroidism include iodine deficiency, developmental defect in the thyroid gland or the hypothalamus/pituitary either due to a genetic defect or an unknown cause, or dysfunction of the thyroid gland or the thyroid hormone. The source of the CH can occur at the level of the hypothalamus/pituitary gland (central CH) or the thyroid gland (primary CH). In both cases, the initial newborn screening will reflect low free thyroid hormone (fT4) levels, with elevated thyroid stimulating hormone (TSH) in primary CH and low/normal TSH in central CH.

Treatment consists of a daily dose of thyroid hormone (thyroxine) by mouth. Because the treatment is simple, effective, and inexpensive, most high-income countries utilize newborn screening with blood thyroid stimulating hormone (TSH) levels to detect congenital hypothyroidism. Most children with congenital hypothyroidism who are appropriately treated with thyroxine grow and develop normally in all respects. Approximately 1 in 4000 newborns have a severe deficiency of thyroid function; a greater number have a mild or moderate deficiency. Incidence of primary CH is 1 in every 2000 to 3000 births, while the incidence of central CH is much lower occurring in 1 of every 16,000 to 30,000 births.

== Signs and symptoms ==
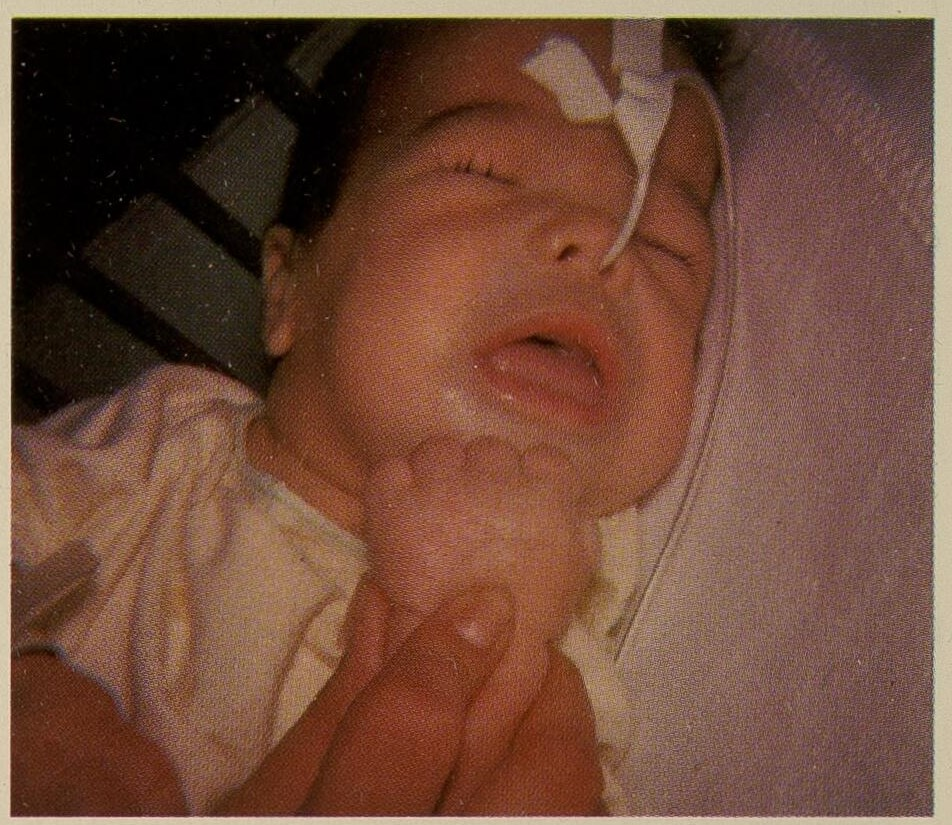
Features of congenital hypothyroidism in neonate, with macroglossia and distinct facies observed.

Infants born with congenital hypothyroidism may show no effects, or may display mild effects that often go unrecognized as a problem: excessive sleeping, reduced interest in nursing, poor muscle tone, low or hoarse cry, infrequent bowel movements, significant jaundice, and low body temperature. If the fetal thyroid hormone deficiency is severe because of complete absence (athyreosis) of the gland, physical features may include a larger anterior fontanel, persistence of a posterior fontanel, an umbilical hernia, and a large tongue (macroglossia).

In the era before newborn screenings, less than half of cases of severe hypothyroidism were recognized in the first month of life. As the months progressed, these babies would grow poorly and have significant neurologic and developmental delays. By several years of age, they would display the recognizable facial and body features of cretinism. Persistence of severe, untreated hypothyroidism resulted in severe mental impairment, with an IQ below 80 in the majority. Most of these children eventually ended up in institutional care.

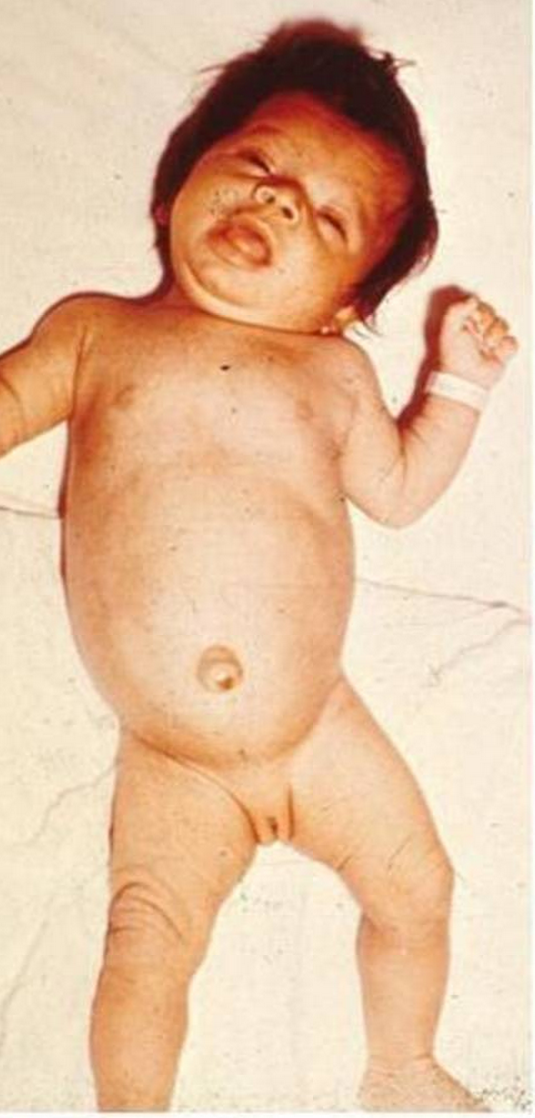
3-month-old infant with untreated CH; picture demonstrates hypotonic posture, myxedematous facies, macroglossia, and umbilical hernia

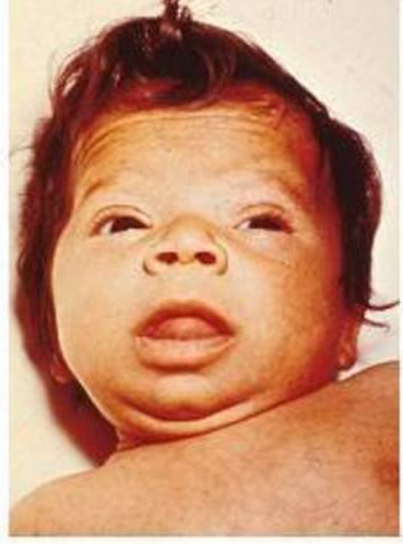
Close up of face, showing myxedematous facies, macroglossia, and skin mottling

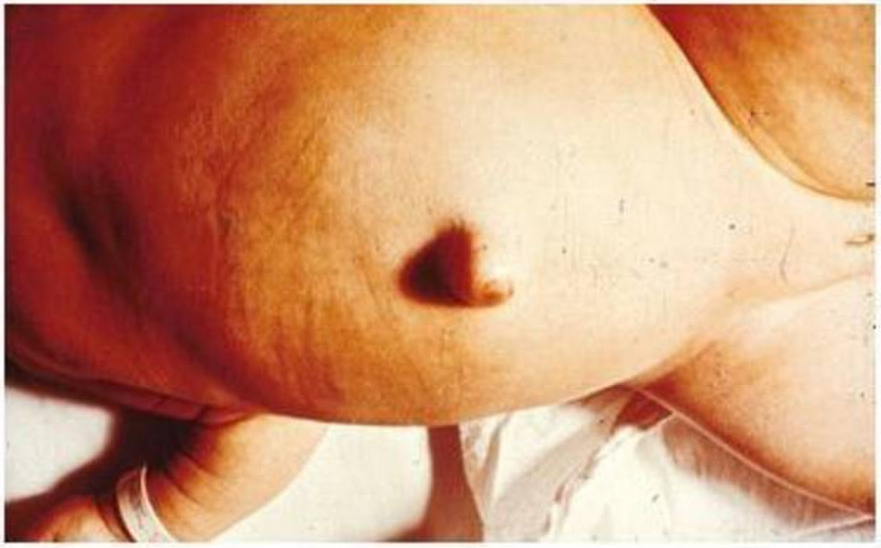
Close up showing abdominal distension and umbilical hernia.

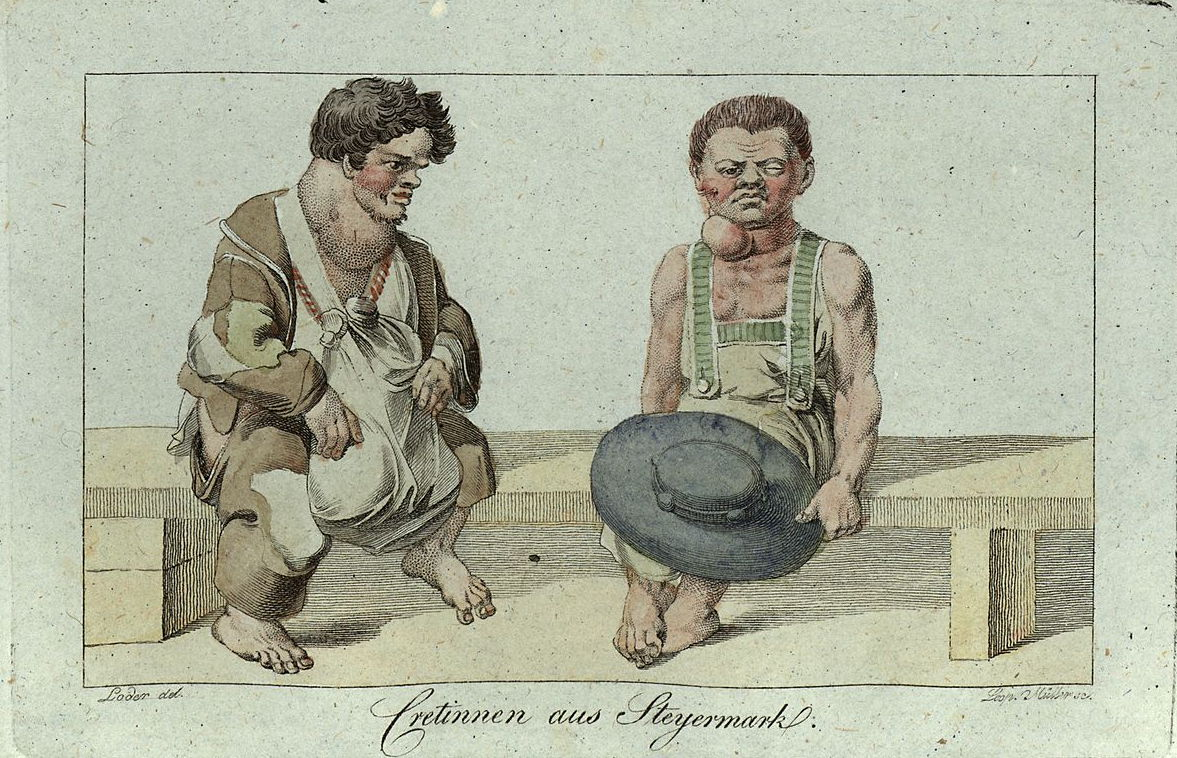
Congenital hypothyroidism, copper engraving, 1815

== Cause ==
Around the world, the most common cause of congenital hypothyroidism is iodine deficiency, but in most of the developed world and areas of adequate environmental iodine, cases are due to a combination of known and unknown causes. Most commonly there is a defect of development of the thyroid gland itself, resulting in an absent (athyreosis) or underdeveloped (hypoplastic) gland. However, recent studies have shown an increase in the number of cases caused by gland in situ (termed dyshormonogenesis when there is a defect in hormone production). A hypoplastic gland may develop higher in the neck or even in the back of the tongue. A gland in the wrong place is referred to as ectopic, and an ectopic gland at the base or back of the tongue is a lingual thyroid. Some of these cases of developmentally abnormal glands result from genetic defects, and some are "sporadic," with no identifiable cause. One Japanese study found a statistical correlation between certain organochlorine insecticides and dioxin-like chemicals in the milk of mothers who had given birth to infants with congenital hypothyroidism. Neonatal hypothyroidism has been reported in cases of infants exposed to lithium, a mood stabilizer used to treat bipolar disorder, in utero. In another systematic review, topical iodine (i.e., iodine-containing disinfectant) was associated with transient hypo- or hyperthyroidism, particularly in preterm babies born before 32 weeks of gestation.

In some instances, hypothyroidism detected by screening may be transient. One common cause of this is the presence of maternal antibodies that temporarily impair thyroid function for several weeks. Preterm or ill neonates may also have a delayed rise in TSH, leading to false-positive newborn screenings and transiently low thyroid hormones. In these cases, a follow-up screening, typically at 4 to 6 weeks, is recommended to re-evaluate the thyroid hormone deficiency.

The word "cretinism" is an old term for the state of mental and physical retardation resulting from untreated congenital hypothyroidism, usually due to iodine deficiency from birth because of low iodine levels in the soil and local food sources. The term, like many other 19th century medical terms, acquired pejorative connotations as it became used in lay speech. It is now deprecated; ICD-11 uses "congenital hypothyroidism due to iodine deficiency" with additional specifiers for the various types of endemic cretinism.

== Genetics ==
Congenital hypothyroidism can also occur due to genetic defects of thyroxine or triiodothyronine synthesis within a structurally normal gland. Among specific defects are thyrotropin (TSH) resistance, iodine trapping defect, organification defect, thyroglobulin, and iodotyrosine deiodinase deficiency. In a small proportion of cases of congenital hypothyroidism, the defect is due to a deficiency of thyroid-stimulating hormone, either isolated or as part of congenital hypopituitarism. Genetic types of nongoitrous congenital hypothyroidism include:

OMIM	Name	Gene
275200	congenital hypothyroidism, nongoitrous 1 CHNG1	TSHR
218700	CHNG2	PAX8
609893	CHNG3	? at 15q25.3-q26.1
275100	CHNG4	TSHB
225250	CHNG5	NKX2-5

Nongoitrous congenital hypothyroidism has been described as the "most prevalent inborn endocrine disorder".

== Diagnosis ==
Newborn screening for congenital hypothyroidism substantially reduces the risk of irreversible neurodevelopmental harm. In high-income settings, most cases are identified through heel-prick dried blood spot testing, in which thyroid-stimulating hormone (TSH) is measured on a filter-paper card. The 2021 European consensus guidelines recommend TSH-based screening performed at least 48 hours after birth as the most sensitive approach for detecting primary congenital hypothyroidism; adding free thyroxine (fT4) improves detection of central congenital hypothyroidism. This timing accounts for the physiologic surge in TSH in the first 24 hours of life, after which levels decline and stabilize, allowing for more accurate screening results. Abnormal screening results are typically confirmed with serum TSH and fT4 before or shortly after starting treatment. For preterm, low-birthweight, or ill neonates, a repeat specimen at 10-14 days of age is recommended because delayed TSH elevation in these infants may yield a false-negative initial result.

=== Evaluation ===
If the TSH is high or free T4 low on the initial newborn screening (dried blood spot), confirmatory serum TSH and T4 are obtained, the infant's doctor and parents are called and a referral to a pediatric endocrinologist is recommended to confirm the diagnosis and initiate treatment. While imaging should not delay treatment, several modalities are available including thyroid ultrasonography, thyroid scintigraphy and radioactive iodine uptake studies. Ultrasound can identify the presence or absence of the thyroid gland, determining its location and size if present. A technetium (Tc-99m pertechnetate) thyroid scan may also be utilized as part of the workup to investigate the etiology of the CH. This scan can detect any functioning thyroid tissue, including ectopic tissue, in situ gland, or complete thyroid absence. Additional testing with radioactive iodine studies can evaluate for any defects in organification (a process necessary to make thyroid hormone).

=== Central vs. Primary Congenital Hypothyroidism ===
The source of congenital hypothyroidism can occur at the level of the hypothalamus or pituitary gland (central) or the thyroid gland (primary). In central CH, the pituitary fails to secrete sufficient TSH to stimulate an otherwise normal thyroid gland, leading to insufficient thyroid hormone production. In primary CH, the thyroid gland itself is defective and fails to secrete adequate thyroid hormones in response to stimulation by TSH. On newborn screenings, the combination of low free T4 and low or normal TSH is suggestive of central CH, whereas low free T4 with elevated TSH is consistent with primary CH. Normally, low free T4 levels trigger a compensatory rise in TSH secretion from the pituitary to restore thyroid hormone levels. Central CH is often part of a broader disorder known as combined pituitary hormone deficiencies (CPHD), which causes other pituitary hormone deficiencies such as growth hormone (GH), adrenocorticotropic hormone (ACTH), luteinizing hormone (LH), and follicle-stimulating hormone (FSH). These deficiencies may lead to other issues such as growth failure, delayed puberty, and neonatal hypoglycemia. Early recognition of CPHD is important because it changes the long-term management and may necessitate additional hormone replacement therapy.

== Treatment ==
The goal of newborn screening programs is to promptly detect CH and start treatment within the first 1-2 weeks of life. Treatment consists of a daily dose of thyroxine, also known by its generic name levothyroxine. It functions as a synthetic form of the main circulating thyroid hormone (T4), which is then peripherally converted to the more biologically active form (T3) in target tissues, replacing the low or missing thyroid hormones. Levothyroxine is available as a small tablet and in several brands. The tablet is crushed and given to the baby with a small amount of water or milk. The most commonly recommended dose range is 10-15 μg/kg daily, typically 12.5 to 37.5 or 44 μg. Within a few weeks, the T_{4} and TSH levels are rechecked to confirm that they are being normalized by treatment. As the child grows, these levels are checked regularly to adjust the dose of levothyroxine to meet the body's changing thyroid hormone requirements. Of note, in central CH, the treatment plan must address any associated pituitary hormone deficiencies, as some cases require replacement of other hormones prior to initiating thyroid hormone replacement therapy. For instance, in cases of concomitant adrenocorticotropic hormone (ACTH) deficiency, starting levothyroxine before hydrocortisone (to address the ACTH deficiency) can increase the body's metabolism without sufficient cortisol production, which can lead to a life-threatening adrenal crisis. Therefore, these infants should receive hydrocortisone prior to thyroid hormone replacement.

== Prognosis ==
Most children born with congenital hypothyroidism who are appropriately and promptly treated with thyroxine grow and develop normally in all respects. Specifically, in adequately treated CH, bone growth, fertility, puberty, cardiac health and other developmental milestones are similar to those in individuals without the disorder. Even properly-treated patients with athyreosis and undetectable T_{4} levels at birth tend to have normal cognitive development; however, mild learning problems may occur and academic performance may fall below that of unaffected siblings. If not urgently treated, neonates with CH typically have irreversible and significant growth and neurocognitive developmental delays.

Congenital hypothyroidism is the most common preventable cause of intellectual disability. Few treatments in the practice of medicine provide as large a benefit for as small an effort. The developmental quotient (from the Gesell Developmental Schedules) of children with hypothyroidism at age 24 months that have received treatment within the first 3 weeks of birth is summarized below:

Severity	Adaptive behavior	Fine motor	Gross motor	Language	Personal-social behavior
Severe	92	89	90	89	90
Moderate	97	97	98	96	96
Mild	100	99	100	99	100

== Epidemiology ==
The incidence of primary congenital hypothyroidism is 1 in every 2000 to 3000 births worldwide, while the incidence of central CH is 1 in every 16,000 to 30,000 births. The incidence of CH has increased over time largely due to wider adoption of newborn screening and lower TSH screening thresholds, a change that minimizes the number of missed CH diagnoses and improves detection of mild CH. The reported global prevalence of CH between 1969 and 2020 has ranged between 4.23 and 4.28 per 10,000 newborns, with significant differences noted across geographic regions and country income levels. Specifically, CH was most prevalent in the Eastern Mediterranean region and in upper-middle income countries and less prevalent in the European region and in high-income countries. The global variability in the incidence of congenital hypothyroidism is less likely due to ethnic differences, and more likely explained by differences in iodine deficiency, genetic thyroid disorders, or to the type of screening method used. Similarly, the increased prevalence may be attributed to preterm infants surviving for longer, a higher number of live births among older mothers, and greater exposure to environmental toxins. Congenital hypothyroidism is caused by an absent or defective thyroid gland, classified into agenesis (22-42%), ectopy (35-42%) and gland in place defects (24-36%). It is also found to be of increased association with female sex and gestational age >40 weeks.

== See also ==
- Congenital hypothyroidism due to iodine deficiency
