= Iodine deficiency =

- Specialty: Endocrinology

Iodine deficiency is a lack of the trace element iodine, a dietary mineral that is essential in the diet. The defiency is endemic in some parts of the world and may result in metabolic problems such as goiter. If congenital, it may result in a syndrome that causes developmental delays and other health problems, sometimes including physical deformities. Iodine deficiency is an important global health issue, especially for fertile and pregnant women. It is also a preventable cause of intellectual disability, as it is necessary for neurodevelopment in children.

The thyroid hormones thyroxine and triiodothyronine contain iodine. In areas with little iodine in the diet, typically remote inland areas where no marine foods are eaten, deficiency is common, especially in mountainous regions where food is grown in iodine-poor soil.

The problem is mainly prevented by the addition of small amounts of iodine to table salt, creating iodized salt. In areas of deficiency, iodine compounds have also been added to other foodstuffs, such as flour, water, and milk. Seafood is a well-known source of iodine.

In the U.S., the use of iodine has decreased over concerns of overdoses since the mid-20th century as the iodine antagonists bromine, perchlorate, and fluoride have become more ubiquitous. In particular, around 1980 the practice of using potassium iodate as dough conditioner in bread and baked goods was gradually replaced by the use of other conditioning agents such as bromide.

Iodine deficiency resulting in goiter occurs in 187 million people globally as of 2010 (2.7% of the population). It resulted in 2700 deaths in 2013, up from 2100 deaths in 1990.

== Signs and symptoms ==
=== Goiter ===
A low amount of thyroxine (one of the two thyroid hormones) in the blood, due to lack of dietary iodine to make it, gives rise to high levels of thyroid stimulating hormone (TSH), which stimulates the thyroid gland to increase many biochemical processes; the cellular growth and proliferation can result in the characteristic swelling or hyperplasia of the thyroid gland or goiter. In mild iodine deficiency, levels of triiodothyronine (T_{3}) may be elevated in the presence of low levels of levothyroxine, as the body converts more of the levothyroxine to triiodothyronine as compensation. Some such patients may have a goiter, without an elevated TSH. The introduction of iodized salt since the early 1900s has eliminated this condition in many affluent countries; however, in Australia, New Zealand, and several European countries, iodine deficiency is a significant public health problem. It is more common in developing countries. Public health initiatives to lower the risk of cardiovascular disease have resulted in lower discretionary salt use at the table. Additionally, there is a trend towards consuming more processed foods in Western countries. The non-iodized salt used in these foods means that people are less likely to obtain iodine from adding salt during cooking.

Goiter is said to be endemic when its prevalence in a population is > 5%, and in most cases, goiter can be treated with iodine supplementation. However, if a goiter is untreated for around five years, iodine supplementation or thyroxine treatment may not reduce thyroid gland size because the thyroid is permanently damaged.

=== Congenital iodine deficiency syndrome ===
Congenital iodine deficiency syndrome, previously known as cretinism, is a condition associated with iodine deficiency and goiter, commonly characterized by mental deficiency, deafness, squint, disorders of stance and gait and stunted growth due to hypothyroidism. Paracelsus was the first to point out the relation between goitrous parents and their mentally disabled children.

As a result of restricted diet, isolation, intermarriage, etc., as well as low iodine content in their food, children often had peculiar stunted bodies and retarded mental faculties, a condition later known to be associated with thyroid hormone deficiency. Diderot, in his 1754 Encyclopédie, described these patients as "crétins". In French, the term "crétin des Alpes" also became current, since the condition was observed in remote valleys of the Alps in particular. The word cretin appeared in English in 1779.

While reporting recent progress towards overcoming iodine-deficiency disorders worldwide, The Lancet noted: "According to World Health Organization, in 2007, nearly 2 billion individuals had insufficient iodine intake, a third being of school age." A conclusion was made that the single most preventable cause of intellectual disability is that of iodine deficiency.

=== Fibrocystic breast changes ===
There is preliminary evidence that iodine deficiency enhances the sensitivity of breast tissue to estrogen. In rats treated with estradiol, iodine deficiency has been shown to lead to changes similar to benign breast changes that are reversible by increased iodine in the diet. In a few studies, iodine supplementation had beneficial effects (such as reducing the presence of breast cyst, fibrous tissue plaques, and breast pain) in women with fibrocystic breast changes.

Protective effects of iodine on breast cancer have been postulated from epidemiologic evidence and described in animal models. Given the antiproliferative properties of iodine in breast tissue, molecular iodine supplementation has been suggested as an adjuvant in breast cancer therapy.

== Risk factors ==
Share of households consuming iodized salt

Following is a list of potential risk factors that may lead to iodine deficiency:

1. Low dietary iodine
2. Selenium deficiency
3. Pregnancy
4. Exposure to radiation
5. Increased intake/plasma levels of goitrogens, such as calcium
6. Sex (higher occurrence in women)
7. Smoking tobacco
8. Alcohol (reduced prevalence in users)
9. Oral contraceptives (reduced prevalence in users)
10. Perchlorates
11. Thiocyanates
12. Age (for different types of iodine deficiency at different ages)

== Pathophysiology ==
Iodine accounts for 65% of the molecular weight of T_{4} and 59% of T_{3}. There is a total of 15–20 mg of iodine in the human body, primarily concentrated in thyroid tissue and hormones. Thirty percent of iodine is distributed in other tissues, including the mammary glands, eyes, gastric mucosa, choroid plexus, arterial walls, the cervix, and salivary glands. In the cells of these tissues, iodide enters directly by sodium-iodide symporter (NIS).

- Venturi S, Guidi A, Venturi M (1996). "[Extrathyroid iodine deficiency disorders: what is the real iodine requirement?]"". Le Basi Razionali della Terapia. 16: 267–275.
- Pellerin P (1961). "La technique d'autoradiographie anatomique a la temperature de l'azote liquide". Path Biol. 232 (9): 233–252.

== Diagnosis ==
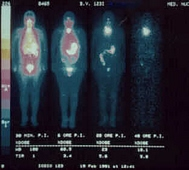
Sequence of 123-iodide human scintiscans after an intravenous injection, (from left) after 30 minutes, 20 hours, and 48 hours. A high and rapid concentration of radioiodide is evident in the periencephalic and cerebrospinal fluid (left), salivary glands, oral mucosa, and the stomach. In the thyroid gland, I-concentration is more progressive, also in the reservoir (from 1% after 30 minutes to 5.8% after 48 hours, of the total injected dose.

The diagnostic workup of a suspected iodine deficiency includes signs and symptoms and possible risk factors mentioned above. A 24-hour urine iodine collection is a useful medical test, as approximately 90% of ingested iodine is excreted in the urine. For the standardized 24-hour test, a 50 mg iodine load is given first, and 90% of this load is expected to be recovered in the urine of the following 24 hours. Recovering less than 90% means high retention, that is, iodine deficiency. The recovery may, however, be well less than 90% during pregnancy, and an intake of goitrogens can alter the test results.

If a 24-hour urine collection is impractical, a random urine iodine-to-creatinine ratio can be used. However, the 24-hour test is more reliable.

A general idea of whether a deficiency exists can be determined through a functional iodine test in the form of an iodine skin test. In this test, the skin is painted with an iodine solution: if the iodine patch disappears quickly, this is taken as a sign of iodine deficiency. However, no accepted norms exist on the expected time interval for the patch to disappear, and in persons with dark skin color, the disappearance of the patch may be difficult to assess. If a urine test is taken shortly after, the results may be altered due to the iodine absorbed previously in a skin test.

== Treatment ==
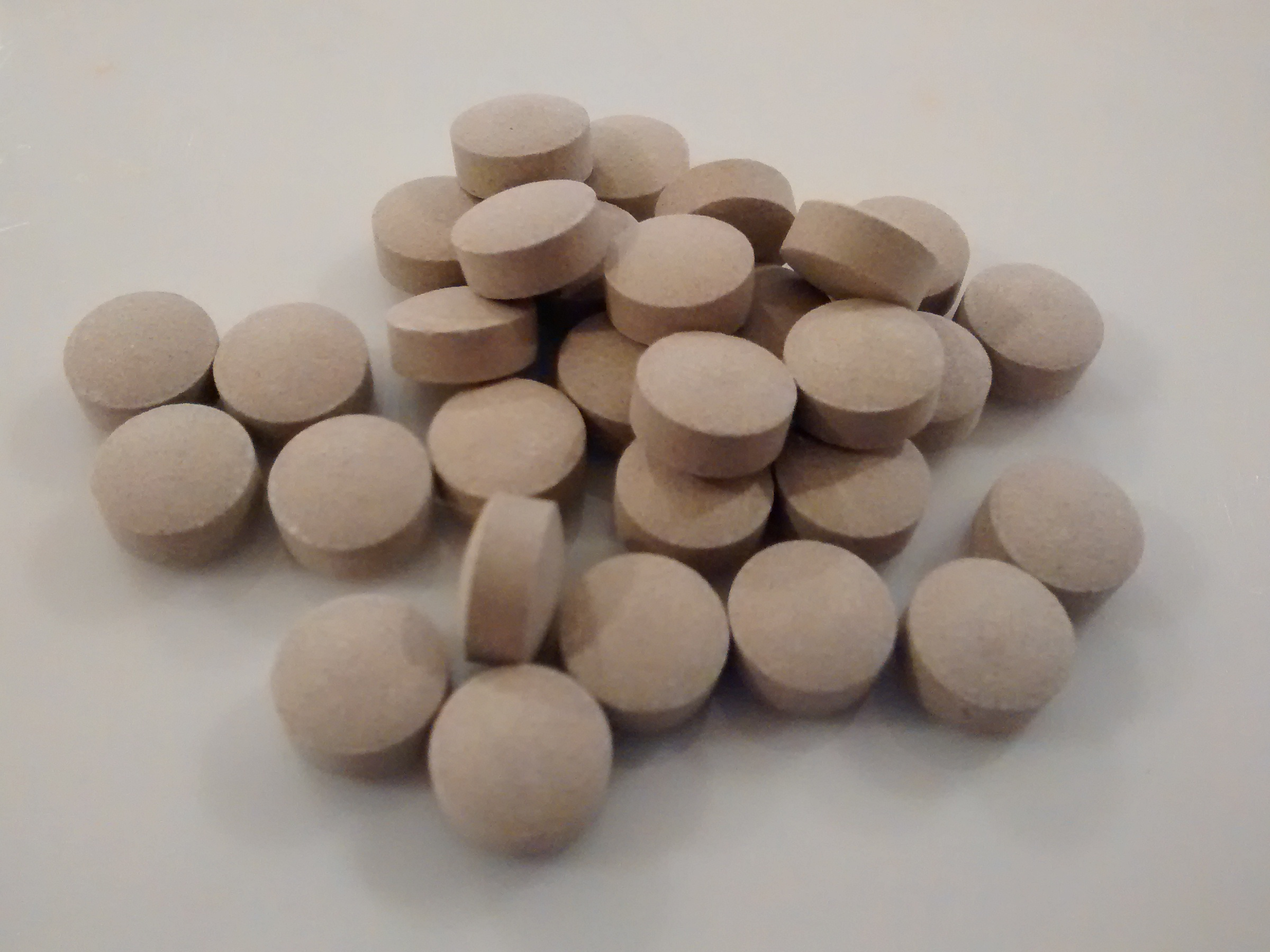
Iodine supplements

Iodine deficiency is treated by ingesting iodine salts, such as those found in food supplements. Mild cases may be treated by using iodized salt in daily food consumption, drinking more milk, eating egg yolks, and saltwater fish. For a salt and/or animal product restricted diet, sea vegetables (kelp, hijiki, dulse, nori (found in sushi)) may be incorporated regularly into a diet as a good source of iodine. In more remote settings, iodized oil may be used.

The recommended daily intake of iodine for non-pregnant adults is 150 μg to maintain normal thyroid function. In pregnant women, the amount increases to 220 μg; in breastfeeding women, the amount is 290 μg.

== Prognosis ==
With iodine supplementation, goiters caused by iodine deficiency decrease in size in very young children and pregnant women. Generally, however, long-standing goiters caused by iodine deficiency respond with only small amounts of shrinkage after iodine supplementation, and patients are at risk for developing hyperthyroidism.

Being pregnant while iodine-deficient additionally carries the risk of causing congenital iodine deficiency syndrome in the newborn. This disease can only be managed by lifelong administration of thyroxine (T_{4}).

== Epidemiology ==
Deaths due to iodine deficiency per million persons in 2012 0–0 1–1 2–3 4–18

Disability-adjusted life year for iodine deficiency per 100,000 inhabitants in 2004. no data <50 50–100 100–150 150–200 200–250 250–300 300–350 350–400 400–450 450–500 500–750 >750

Iodine deficiency resulting in goiter occurs in 187 million people globally as of 2010 (2.7% of the population). Certain areas of the world, due to natural deficiency and unavailability of iodine, are severely affected by iodine deficiency, which affects approximately two billion people worldwide. It is particularly common in the Western Pacific, South-East Asia and Africa. Among other nations affected by iodine deficiency, China and Kazakhstan have begun taking action, while Russia has not. Successful campaigns for the adoption of the use of iodized salt require education of salt producers and sellers and a communication campaign directed at the public. The cost of adding iodine to salt is negligible—"Only a few cents a ton."

Iodine deficiency has largely been confined to the developing world for several generations, but reductions in salt consumption and changes in dairy processing practices eliminating the use of iodine-based disinfectants have led to increasing prevalence of the condition in Australia and New Zealand in recent years. A proposal to mandate the use of iodized salt in most commercial breadmaking was adopted in Australia in October 2009. In a study of the United Kingdom published in 2011, almost 70% of test subjects were found to be iodine deficient. The study's authors suggested an investigation regarding "evidence-based recommendations for iodine supplementation".

Iodine deficiency can impair brain development and may lead to intellectual disability. Lacking iodine during human development causes a fall, in average, of 12 intelligence quotient (IQ) points in China. A study of U.S. military data collected during the First and Second World Wars found that the introduction of salt iodization in the U.S. in the 1920s resulted in an increase in IQ, by approximately one standard deviation, for the quarter of the U.S. population most deficient in iodine, explaining about "one decade's worth of the upward trend in IQ" in the U.S. (i.e., the Flynn effect). The same study documented "a large increase in thyroid-related deaths following the countrywide adoption of iodized salt, which affected mostly older individuals in localities with high prevalence of iodine deficiency" between 1910–1960. (Note: "Individuals in whom the chronic iodine deficiency has induced thyroid hyperplasia and goiter with autonomous thyroid follicular cells may respond to excessive intake with resultant hyperthyroidism." A similar short term increase in deaths happened in the UK with the (unintentional) iodization of milk, peaking in 1931–1940.)

In iodine-deficient or mildly iodine-deficient areas of Europe, iodine deficiency is frequent during pregnancy despite the widespread use of iodised salt, posing risks to the neurodevelopment of foetuses. In one study performed in a mildly iodine-deficient area, iodine deficiency was found to be present in more than half of breastfeeding women; in contrast, the majority of their newborns had iodine excess, mostly due to neonatal exposure to iodine-containing disinfectants. A 2014 meta-analysis found that iodine supplementation "improves some maternal thyroid indices and may benefit aspects of cognitive function in school-age children, even in marginally iodine-deficient areas".

=== Deficient populations ===
In areas where there is little iodine in the diet, typically remote inland areas and semi-arid equatorial climates where no marine foods are eaten, iodine deficiency gives rise to hypothyroidism, symptoms of which are extreme fatigue, goiter, mental slowing, depression, weight gain, and low basal body temperatures.

Iodine deficiency is the leading cause of preventable intellectual disability, a result which occurs primarily when babies or small children are rendered hypothyroidic by a lack of the element. Adding iodine to table salt has largely eliminated this problem in the wealthier nations, but as of March 2006, iodine deficiency remained a serious public health problem in the developing world.

Iodine deficiency is also a problem in certain areas of Europe. In Germany, it has been estimated to cause a billion dollars in health care costs per year. A modeling analysis suggests universal iodine supplementation for pregnant women in England may save £199 (2013 UK pounds) to the health service per pregnant woman and save £4476 per pregnant woman in societal costs.

Iodine deficiency was previously a common disease in Norway because the iodine content of the drinking water was low. Before 1950 goiter was a widespread disease caused by iodine deficiency. Up to 80 percent of the population were affected in inland areas. In the coastal communities, saltwater fish were an important part of the diet, and because of the presence of iodine in seawater, goiter was less common than in the inland districts. From the 1950s, Norwegians started adding iodine to dairy cow feed. Since milk was an essential part of the Norwegian diet, the incidence of goiter decreased in the population.

Iodine deficiency is prominent in Israel, which lacks any legislation on iodine fortification of table salt or drinking water.

== See also ==
- Basil Hetzel
- International Council for the Control of Iodine Deficiency Disorders
- Lugol's iodine
