= Endocrine disease =

Disorders of the endocrine system

Endocrine glands
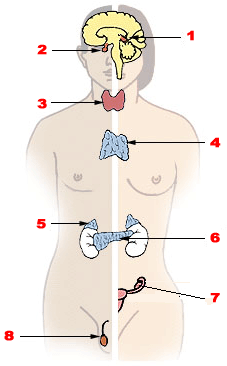
- Major endocrine glands. (Male left, female right.) 1. Pineal gland 2. Pituitary gland 3. Thyroid gland 4. Thymus 5. Adrenal gland 6. Pancreas 7. Ovary 8. Testes
- Specialty: Endocrinology

Endocrine diseases are disorders of the endocrine system. The branch of medicine associated with endocrine disorders is known as endocrinology.

== Types of disease ==
Broadly speaking, endocrine disorders may be subdivided into three groups:

1. Endocrine gland hypofunction/hyposecretion (leading to hormone deficiency)
2. Endocrine gland hyperfunction/hypersecretion (leading to hormone excess)
3. Tumours (benign or malignant) of endocrine glands

Endocrine disorders are often quite complex, involving a mixed picture of hyposecretion and hypersecretion because of the feedback mechanisms involved in the endocrine system. For example, most forms of hyperthyroidism are associated with an excess of thyroid hormone and a low level of thyroid stimulating hormone.

== List of diseases ==
=== Glucose homeostasis disorders ===
- Diabetes
  - Type 1 Diabetes
  - Type 2 Diabetes
  - Gestational Diabetes
  - Mature Onset Diabetes of the Young
  - Diabetic myopathy
- Hypoglycemia
  - Idiopathic hypoglycemia
  - Insulinoma
- Glucagonoma

=== Thyroid disorders ===
- Goitre
- Hyperthyroidism
  - Graves-Basedow disease
  - Toxic multinodular goitre
  - Thyrotoxic myopathy
- Hypothyroidism
  - Hypothyroid myopathies
    - Kocher-Debre-Semelaigne syndrome
    - Hoffmann syndrome
    - Myasthenic syndrome
    - Atrophic form
- Thyroiditis
  - Hashimoto's thyroiditis
- Thyroid cancer
- Thyroid hormone resistance

=== Calcium homeostasis disorders and Metabolic bone disease ===
- Parathyroid gland disorders
  - Hyperparathyroidism
    - Primary hyperparathyroidism
    - Secondary hyperparathyroidism
    - Tertiary hyperparathyroidism
    - Hyperparathyroid myopathy
  - Hypoparathyroidism
    - Pseudohypoparathyroidism
    - Hypoparathyroid myopathy
- Osteoporosis
- Osteitis deformans (Paget's disease of bone)
- Rickets
- Osteomalacia

=== Pituitary gland disorders ===
==== Posterior pituitary ====
- Diabetes insipidus
- Syndrome of inappropriate antidiuretic hormone secretion (SIADH)

==== Anterior pituitary ====
- Hypopituitarism (or Panhypopituitarism)
- Pituitary tumors
  - Pituitary adenomas
  - Prolactinoma (or Hyperprolactinemia)
  - Acromegaly, gigantism, dwarfism
  - Cushing's disease

=== Adrenal gland disorders ===
- Addison's disease
- Adrenal crisis
- Adrenal insufficiency
- Adrenal tumour
- Congenital adrenal hyperplasia
- Hypercortisolism (Cushing's disease)
  - Steroid myopathy
- Hypoaldosteronism
- Hyperaldosteronism

=== Sex hormone disorders ===
- Disorders of sex development or intersex disorders
  - Hermaphroditism
  - Gonadal dysgenesis
  - Androgen insensitivity syndromes
- Hypogonadism (Gonadotropin deficiency)
  - Inherited (genetic and chromosomal) disorders
    - Kallmann syndrome
    - Klinefelter syndrome
    - Turner syndrome
  - Acquired disorders
    - Ovarian failure (also known as Premature Menopause)
    - Testicular failure
      - Testosterone deficiency myopathy
- Disorders of Puberty
  - Delayed puberty
  - Precocious puberty
- Menstrual function or fertility disorders
  - Amenorrhea
  - Polyendocrine metabolic ovarian syndrome (PMOS)

=== Tumours of the endocrine glands not mentioned elsewhere ===
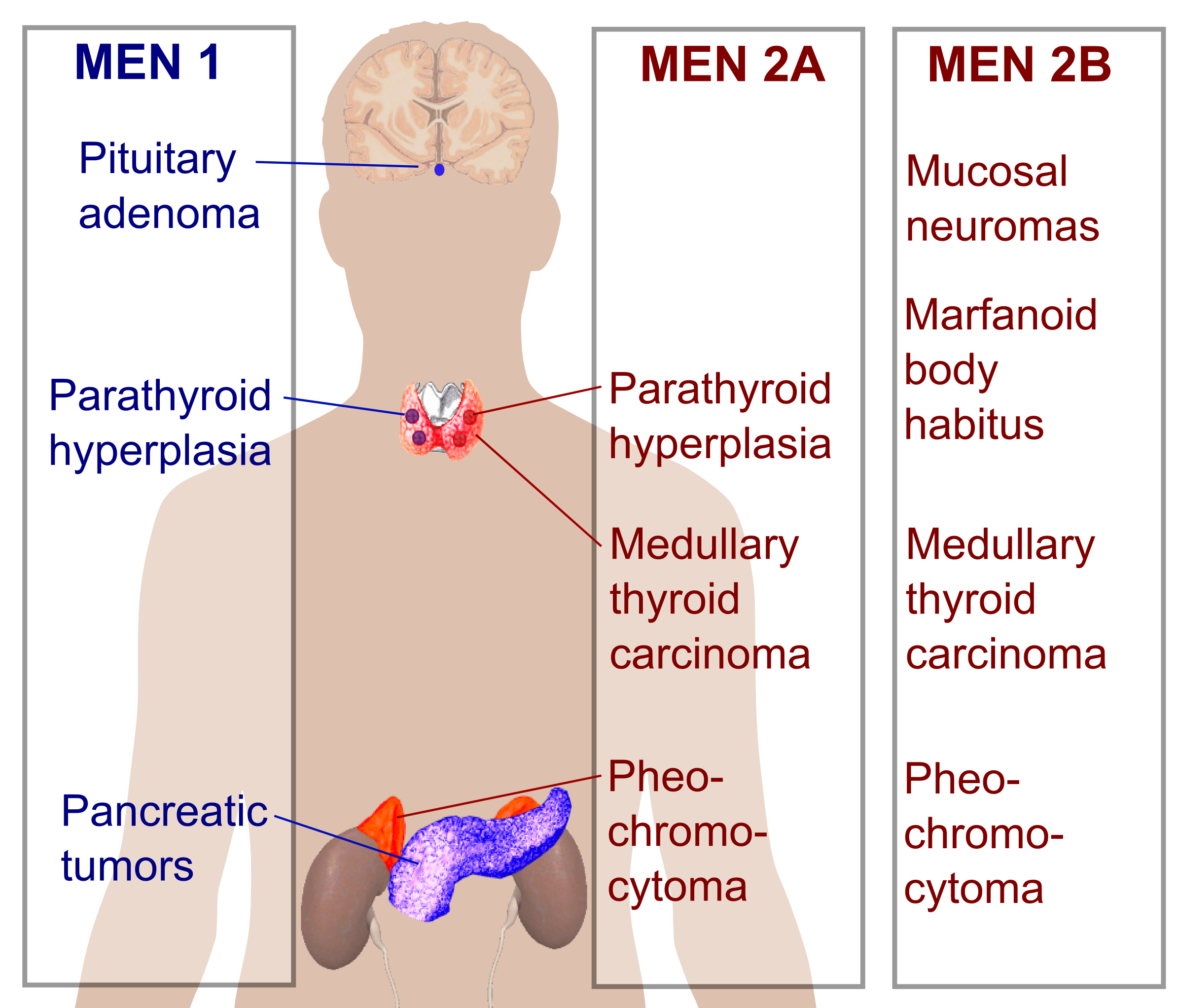
Multiple endocrine neoplasia types.

- Multiple endocrine neoplasia
  - MEN type 1
  - MEN type 2a
  - MEN type 2b
- Carcinoid syndrome

=== See also separate organs ===
- Autoimmune polyendocrine syndromes
- Incidentaloma - an unexpected finding on diagnostic imaging, often of endocrine glands

== Endocrine emergencies ==
In endocrinology, medical emergencies include diabetic ketoacidosis, hyperosmolar hyperglycemic state, hypoglycemic coma, acute adrenocortical insufficiency, phaeochromocytoma crisis, hypercalcemic crisis, thyroid storm, myxoedema coma and pituitary apoplexy.

Emergencies arising from decompensated pheochromocytomas or parathyroid adenomas are sometimes referred for emergency resection when aggressive medical therapies fail to control the patient's state, however the surgical risks are significant, especially blood pressure lability and the possibility of cardiovascular collapse after resection (due to a brutal drop in respectively catecholamines and calcium, which must be compensated with gradual normalization). It remains debated when emergency surgery is appropriate as opposed to urgent or elective surgery after continued attempts to stabilize the patient, notably in view of newer and more efficient medications and protocols.

== See also ==
- List of MeSH codes (C19)
- List of ICD-9 codes 240-279: Endocrine, nutritional and metabolic diseases, and immunity disorders
- Diabetes self-management
