= Thyrotoxic myopathy =

Muscular degeneration due to overproduction of thyroxine by the thyroid

- Specialty: Neurology

Thyrotoxic myopathy (TM) is a neuromuscular disorder that develops due to the overproduction of the thyroid hormone thyroxine. Also known as hyperthyroid myopathy, TM is one of many myopathies that lead to muscle weakness and muscle tissue breakdown. Evidence indicates the onset may be caused by hyperthyroidism. Physical symptoms of TM may include muscle weakness, the breakdown of muscle tissue, fatigue, and heat intolerance. Physical acts such as lifting objects and climbing stairs may become increasingly difficult. If untreated, TM can be an extremely debilitating disorder that can, in extreme rare cases, lead to death. If diagnosed and treated properly the effects can be controlled and in most cases reversed leaving no lasting effects.

== Symptoms and signs ==
Physical symptoms may include:

- Muscle weakness
- Degeneration of muscle tissue
- Fatigue
- Heat intolerance

=== Chronic TM ===
Symptoms of chronic TM arise slowly. Patients usually cite decreased exercise tolerance, increased fatigue, and difficulty completing certain tasks after six months of onset. If chronic TM goes untreated worse symptoms may develop including difficulty swallowing and respiratory distress. These occurrences are rare since diagnosis of chronic TM usually occurs during the early stages of onset, before these symptoms develop.

=== Acute TM ===
Acute TM is rarer than chronic TM and symptoms appear within days of onset. Acute TM degrades muscle fibers rapidly. Due to the rapid degradation of muscle fibers patients usually cite severe muscle cramps and muscle pain. Some acute TM patients may present symptoms of blurred vision and bulging eyes due to eye muscle degradation and inflammation, but documented cases are rare. Acute TM patients usually have very weak respiratory muscles and often severe respiratory failure occurs.

== Cause ==
Various authors have suggested that thyrotoxic myopathy is a result of the weight loss and generalized asthenia associated with hyperthyroidism. Muscle involvement has been reported to occur in about 80% of thyrotoxic patients (see section #Epidemiology), and the most common causes of hyperthyroidism are Graves’ disease, toxic multinodular goiter, and autonomously functioning thyroid adenoma.

== Pathophysiology ==
Excess thyroxine is believed to bring about the onset of thyrotoxic myopathy and eventually cause the degradation of muscle tissue. Thyroxine is a hormone produced in the thyroid gland that regulates the growth metabolism of the nervous system and regulates basal metabolic rate of many cell types. Scientists agree thyroxine brings about the degradation of muscle fibers specifically at the motor end plates of neuromuscular junctions. There is debate as to whether thyroxine degrades the motor end plates from the muscular side, from the nervous system side, or a combination.

To understand how high levels of thyroxine can be toxic and lead to thyrotoxic myopathy physiologically, consider basic neuromuscular junction function. Under normal circumstances, muscle contraction occurs when electrical impulses travel down descending axons from the brain or spinal cord towards the neuromuscular junction. The axon terminal depolarizes and releases Acetylcholine (ACh), a neurotransmitter, which in turn stimulates the motor end plate (MEP) of the muscle fiber the nerve is innervating. When the MEP depolarizes the muscle fiber releases calcium initiating the process of muscle contraction.

With the onset of TM due to thyroxine toxicity, there is evidence to suggest that structural changes in MEPs could lead to muscle fiber degradation, weakness, and fatigue. Research indicates that decreased levels of Acetylcholinesterase AChE, an enzyme that breaks down ACh, was observed within the neuromuscular junction. This decrease in AChE blocks degradation of ACh causing ACh to increasingly stimulate the MEP of the muscle fiber. Over stimulation of MEP could cause more muscle contractions which eventually evoke muscle fiber fatigue, weakness, and finally degradation, which are characteristic symptoms of TM. It is believed this decrease in AChE and MEP structural changes could be the result of over stimulation of thyroxin blocking the axoplasmic flow of trophic factors down the axon terminal especially considering thyroxine's role in nervous system growth and metabolism regulation.

Other research indicates muscle fiber fatigue, weakness, and degradation associated with TM is the direct action thyroxine has on the muscle fibers themselves. Research suggests thyroxine directly causes a decrease in protein kinase affinity to cAMP within muscle fibers This causes an increase in cAMP within the muscle fibers since protein kinases are not inactivating cAMP. Increased levels of cAMP within the muscle fibers cause increased release of Ca2+ from the muscle fiber's sarcoplasmic reticulum which eventually leads to more muscle contractions. Like the nervous system proposal increased muscle contractions eventually evoke muscle fiber fatigue, weakness, and finally degradation, which are characteristic symptoms of TM. There is evidence to support both theories; it has been suggested that toxic levels of thyroxine may ultimately attack muscle fibers directly and indirectly by the motor neurons that innervate the affected muscle fibers.

== Diagnosis ==
Thyrotoxic myopathy is usually diagnosed by a neurologist who has extensive experience diagnosing neuromuscular disorders. There are many types of neuromuscular disorders that present similar physical symptoms. Extensive clinical tests are performed first to determine if there is a neuromuscular disorder and then to determine which disorder it is. Electromyography is used to diagnose myopathies by comparing muscle contraction responses to electrical stimulus. For TM results may indicate normal responses or myopathic responses depending on how the disorder has progressed. Early detection may indicate normal contractual responses while highly progressed TM may show a significant decrease in contraction response.

Blood tests are then conducted to determine the specific myopathy. For TM, blood tests reveal increased thyroxine levels. Increased thyroxine levels accompanied with decreased neuromuscular responses together provide best evidence for TM diagnosis. Creatine phosphokinase levels are also examined during the blood tests. Normal or increased levels may be observed with TM depending on the severity of TM's progression. Normal levels indicate possible early stages of progression while increased levels may indicate later stages of thyrotoxic myopathy. Muscle biopsies may also be taken and examined to determine TM's progression with respect to physical degradation. Like measured creatine phosphokinase levels results from the muscle biopsy characteristic of TM typically show normal to severe fiber degradation with respective indications to the severity of progression.

== Treatment ==
Treatment for TM is typically done with the collaboration of many medical specialists. Usually a neuromuscular specialist, an endocrinologist, a surgeon, and an ophthalmologist will combine their efforts to successfully treat patients with TM. If a patient develops significant to severe muscle degradation as a result of TM, a physical therapist may be consulted for rehabilitation. Since excess thyroxine leads to onset of TM, the overall goal of treatment is to reduce the overproduction of thyroxine from the thyroid gland and restore normal thyroid homeostasis. This can be accomplished three ways including using medication, radiation, and surgery.

The first choice involves using medications to alleviate the symptoms and reverse the damage by blocking the production of thyroxine from the thyroid gland. Beta-blockers are used to alleviate the symptoms associated with TM. But beta-blockers do not reduce the damage done by excess thyroxine. Medications such as propylthiouracil and methimazole are administered to block the release of thyroxine from the thyroid and to block the damage thyroxine inflicts on muscle fiber tissue.

One treatment option is the use of radioactive iodine which directly destroys the overactive thyroid gland. The thyroid gland naturally uses iodine to produce thyroxine and other hormones. It cannot distinguish between normal iodine and the radioactive version. Administering the radioactive isotope causes the thyroid to take in the lethal iodine and quickly radiation destroys it. Typically overproduction of thyroxine using radio-iodine is blocked with one dose. The drawback to this treatment is the thyroid gland is completely destroyed and patients often develop hypothyroidism. Some do so only a few months after treatment while others may not be affected for 20–30 years. Hypothyroidism patients must begin a lifelong regimen of thyroid replacement hormones. While the onset of hypothyroidism is most common with radio-iodine treatment, the condition has been observed in patients treated with medication series and surgery.

The last option for TM treatment includes surgical removal of portions of the thyroid which can also be performed to restore thyroid homeostasis. This treatment option usually is done when overproduction of TM is caused by a toxic multinodular goiter. Since these goiters enlarge the thyroid and can cause the patient to become physically disfigured surgical treatment can alleviate both the aesthetic and physiological effects simultaneously.

== Prognosis ==
TM, with proper diagnosis and effective treatment, can be beaten. Patients who are diagnosed have a normal life expectancy and can ultimately lead healthy lives if proper treatment is administered. Typically, once the over-production of thyroxine is corrected and thyroid function adequately reaches a level of homeostasis, patients begin to regain muscle strength in two to four months. Depending on the severity of the TM progression symptoms may take up to a year to completely reverse the damage done by TM. Untreated TM can eventually cause severe respiratory distress or arrest possible leading to death, yet this is very rarely seen.

== Epidemiology ==
The onset of TM requires toxic levels of the thyroxine hormone due to overproduction by the thyroid gland. Documented cases have only been diagnosed in conjunction with patients with hyperthyroidism. While hyperthyroidism is more common in women, the development of TM was more common among men with hyperthyroidism. Case studies of patients with diagnosed hyperthyroidism showed that only about half of them complained of symptoms characteristic of TM. Further examination as described above indicated that about 75% of the studied patients showed signs of muscle fiber degeneration. This indicates that either at the time of study some patients were in early stages of TM or the symptoms were insignificant patients.
