= Signs and symptoms of Graves' disease =

The signs and symptoms of Graves' disease generally result from the direct and indirect effects of hyperthyroidism, although they can also be caused by other thyroidal conditions, such as Graves' ophthalmopathy, goitre and pretibial myxedema. These clinical manifestations can involve virtually every system in the body.

The mechanisms that mediate these effects are not well understood. The severity of the signs and symptoms of hyperthyroidism is related to the duration of the disease, the magnitude of the thyroid hormone excess, and the patient's age.

Although the majority of patients experience significant improvement and remission after proper medical care, health care providers should be aware of variability in individual response to hyperthyroidism and individual sensitivity to thyroid hormone fluctuations. Patients with Graves' disease can also undergo periods of hypothyroidism (inadequate production of thyroid hormone; see symptoms of hypothyroidism), due to the challenges of finding the right dosage of thyroid hormone suppression and/or supplementation. The body's need for thyroid hormone can also change over time, such as in the first months after radioactive iodine treatment (RAI). Thyroid autoimmune diseases can also be volatile, as hyperthyroidism can interchange with hypothyroidism and euthyroidism.

== General symptoms ==
=== Skin/Hair/Nails ===
- Pretibial myxedema: Waxy, discolored induration of the skin
- Warm and moist skin
- Redness of the elbows is frequently present. It is probably the result of the combination of increased activity, an exposed part, and a hyperirritable vasomotor system.
- Thin and fine hair
- Brittle nails
- Plummer's nail

=== Nose/Sinuses ===
- Chronic sinus infections

=== Neck ===
- Goitre (enlarged thyroid): If the thyroid grows large enough, it may compress the recurrent laryngeal nerve, producing vocal cord paralysis, dysphonia, and even respiratory stridor. Compression of the sympathetic chain may result in Horner's syndrome.

=== Eyes ===
- Graves' ophthalmopathy (protrusion of one or both eyes)

=== Respiratory/Cardiac ===
- Shortness of breath
- Cardiovascular features may include hypertension, and heart rate that may be rapid or irregular in character; these may be perceived as palpitations. Less common findings include high-output heart failure, left ventricular hypertrophy, premature atrial and ventricular contractions, atrial fibrillation, congestive heart failure, angina, myocardial infarction, systemic embolization, death from cardiovascular collapse and resistance to some drug effects (digoxin, coumadin).

=== Gastrointestinal ===
- Gastrointestinal symptoms. This includes increased bowel movements, but malabsorption is unusual.

=== Musculoskeletal ===
- Hyperreflexia, with a rapid relaxation phase.
- Tremor (usually fine shaking; tremor of the outstretched fingers). In a small study of newly diagnosed hyperthyroid patients, tremor was observed in 76% of them. Some studies lay the cause for hyperthyroid tremor with a heightened beta-adrenergic state, others suggest an increased metabolism of dopamine.
- Weakness or muscle weakness (especially in the large muscles of the arms and legs). This latter occurs in 60 to 80 percent of patients with untreated hyperthyroidism. Muscle weakness is rarely the chief complaint. The likelihood and degree of muscle weakness is correlated with the duration and severity of the hyperthyroid state, and becomes more likely after the age of 40. Muscle strength returns gradually over several months after the hyperthyroidism has been treated.
- Muscle degeneration

=== Neurologic ===
- A distinctly excessive reaction to all sorts of stimuli.
- A marked increase in fatigue, or asthenia, is often prominent. This increased weariness may be combined with hyperactivity; patients remark that they are impelled to incessant activity, which, however, causes great fatigue.
- Neurological seizures, neuropathy from nerve entrapment by lesions of pretibial myxedema, and hypokalemic periodic paralysis may occur. Athetoid, choreia, and corticospinal tract damage, are rare. An acute thyrotoxic encephalopathy is very rare.

=== Endocrine ===
- Weight loss despite normal or increased appetite. Some patients (especially younger ones) gain weight due to excessive appetite stimulation that exceeds the weight loss effect.
- Increased appetite.
- Increased sweating
- Heat intolerance
- Abnormal breast enlargement in men
- Augmented calcium levels in the blood (by as much as 25% – known as hypercalcaemia). This can cause stomach upset, excessive urination, and impaired kidney function.
- Diabetes may be activated or intensified, and its control worsened. The diabetes is ameliorated or may disappear when the thyrotoxicosis is treated.
- Reproductive symptoms in men may include reduced free testosterone (due to the elevation of testosterone-estrogen binding globulin level), diminished libido, erectile dysfunction and (reversible) impaired sperm production with lower mean sperm density, a high incidence of sperm abnormalities, and reduced mobility of the sperm cells.
- Women may experience infrequent menstruation or irregular and scant menstrual flow along with difficulty conceiving, infertility and recurrent miscarriage.

=== Psychiatric ===
- Insomnia

=== Other ===
- Evidence of mild or severe liver disease may be found.

== Effects on the skeleton ==
Overt hyperthyroidism caused by Grave's Disease is associated with accelerated bone remodeling (resulting in increased porosity of cortical bone and reduced volume of trabecular bone). This can lead to reduced bone density and eventually osteoporosis as well as increased fracture rates. The increased hip fracture rates later in life in turn cause excess late mortality. The changes in bone metabolism are connected with negative calcium balance, an increased excretion of calcium and phosphorus in the urine (hypercalciuria) and stool, and, rarely, hypercalcemia. In hyperthyroidism, the normal cycle duration of bone resorption of approximately 200 days is halved, and each cycle is associated with a 9.6 percent loss of mineralized bone. In hypothyroidism, cycle length approximates 700 days and is associated with a 17 percent increase in mineralized bone.

The extent of the reduction in bone density in most studies is 10–20%. The clinical manifestations on bone differ depending on the age of the patient. Postmenopausal woman are most sensitive to accelerated bone loss from thyrotoxicosis. Accelerated bone growth in growing children can increase ossification in the short term, but generally results in short-stature adults compared with the predicted heights.

If thyrotoxicosis is treated early, bone loss can be minimized. The level of calcium in the blood can be determined by a simple blood test, and a Dual Energy X-Ray Absorptiometry scan can help determine patient bone density relative to the rest of the population. There are many medications that can help to rebuild bone mass and to prevent further bone loss, such as Bisphosphonates. Risedronate treatment has been demonstrated to help restore bone mass in osteopenia/osteoporosis associated with Graves' disease. Nevertheless, weight-bearing exercises, a balanced diet, calcium intake of about 1500 mg a day and enough vitamin D, are of course elementary foundations.

== Eye symptoms ==
Hyperthyroidism almost always causes general eye symptoms like dryness and irritation, regardless of what the cause of the hyperthyroid state is. However, these need to be distinguished from Graves' ophthalmopathy, which can only occur in patients who have Graves' disease. (It may also, rarely, be seen in Hashimoto's thyroiditis, primary hypothyroidism, and thyroid cancer).

About 20–25% of patients with Graves' disease will suffer from clinically obvious Graves' ophthalmopathy, and not just from the eye signs of hyperthyroidism. Only 3 to 5% will develop severe ophthalmopathy. However, when subjected to closer inspection (e.g. by magnetic resonance imaging of the orbits) many more patients have evidence of ophthalmopathy. It is estimated that for every 100,000 persons, 16 women and 3 men have Graves' ophthalmopathy every year.

Although it is true that in most patients ophthalmopathy, goiter, and symptoms of thyrotoxicosis appear more or less coincidentally, it is also true that in certain cases eye signs may appear long before thyrotoxicosis is evident, or become worse when the thyrotoxicosis is subsiding or has been controlled by treatment. In approximately 20% of ophthalmopathy patients, ophthalmopathy appears before the onset of hyperthyroidism, in about 40% concurrently, and in about 20% in the six months after diagnosis. In the remainder, the eye disease first becomes apparent after treatment of the hyperthyroidism, more often in patients treated with radioiodine.

It can sometimes be difficult to distinguish between eye symptoms due to hyperthyroidism and those due to Graves' antibodies, because the two often occur coincidentally. What can make things particularly difficult, is that many patients with hyperthyroidism have lid retraction, which leads to stare and lid lag (due to contraction of the levator palpebrae muscles of the eyelids). This stare may then give the appearance of protruding eyeballs (proptosis), when none in fact exists. This subsides when the hyperthyroidism is treated.

=== Due to Graves' ophthalmopathy ===
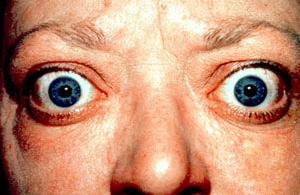
Photo showing the classic finding of proptosis and lid retraction in Graves' disease

Graves' ophthalmopathy is characterized by inflammation of the extraocular muscles, orbital fat and connective tissue. It results in the following signs, which can be extremely distressing to the patient:

- Most frequent are symptoms due to conjunctival or corneal irritation: burning, photophobia, tearing, pain, and a gritty or sandy sensation.
- Protruding eyeballs (known as proptosis and exophthalmos).
- Diplopia (double vision) is common.
- Limitation of eye movement (due to impairment of eye muscle function).
- Periorbital and conjunctival edema (accumulation of fluid beneath the skin around the eyes).
- In severe cases, the optic nerve may be compressed and acuity of vision impaired.
- Occasionally loss of vision.

=== Due to hyperthyroidism ===
In the absence of Graves' ophthalmopathy, patients may demonstrate other ophthalmic symptoms and signs due to hyperthyroidism:

- Dry eyes (due to loss of corneal moisture).
- A sense of irritation, discomfort, or pain in the eyes.
- A tingling sensation behind the eyes or the feeling of grit or sand in the eyes.
- Excessive tearing that is often made worse by exposure to cold air, wind, or bright lights.
- Swelling or redness of the eyes.
- Stare
- Lid lag (Von Graefe's sign)
- Sensitivity to light
- Blurring of vision
- Widened palpebral fissures
- Infrequent blinking
- The appearance of lid retraction.

== Neuropsychological manifestations ==
Several studies have suggested a high prevalence of neuropsychiatric disorders and mental disorder symptoms in Graves' disease (and thyroid disease in general), which are similar to those in patients with organic brain disease. These manifestations are diverse, affecting the central and peripheral nervous systems. The vast majority of patients with hyperthyroidism meet criteria for some psychiatric disorders, and those with milder presentations are probably not entirely free of mental symptoms such as emotional lability, tension, depression and anxiety. Anxiety syndromes related to hyperthyroidism are typically complicated by major depression and cognitive decline, such as in memory and attention. Some studies contradict the psychological findings. For example, a large 2002 study found "no statistical association between thyroid dysfunction, and the presence of depression or anxiety disorder." In one study on hospitalised elderly patients, over half had cognitive impairment with either dementia or confusion. However, a controlled study on 31 Graves' disease patients found that while patients had subjective reports of cognitive deficits in the toxic phase of Graves' thyrotoxicosis, formal testing found no cognitive impairment and suggested the reported symptoms may reflect the affective and somatic manifestations of hyperthyroidism. Notably, a literature review of 2006 notes methodology issues in the consistency of Graves' disease diagnostic criteria, which might explain the apparently contradicting findings. These researchers found many reports about residual complaints in patients who were euthyroid after treatment, with a high prevalence of anxiety disorders and bipolar disorder, as well as elevated scores on scales of anxiety, depression and psychological distress. In a 1992 study, a significant proportion of the 137 questioned patients with Graves' disease reported – among other things – increased crying (55%), being easily startled (53%), being tired all the time (47%), a significant decrease in social activity (46%), feelings of being out of control (45%), feelings of hopelessness (43%), loss of sense of humor (41%), loss of interest in things they formerly enjoyed (39%), not being able to 'connect' with others (34%).

Several studies point out that the severity of psychiatric symptoms could easily result in an inappropriate referral to a psychiatrist prior to the diagnosis of hyperthyroidism. Consequently, undiagnosed hyperthyroidism sometimes results in inappropriate use of psychotropic medications; prompt recognition of hyperthyroidism (or hypothyroidism) through thyroid function screening is therefore recommended in the evaluation of patients with psychiatric symptoms. Naturally, the management of patients would be improved by collaboration between an endocrinologist and a psychiatrist.

Overall, reported symptoms vary from mild to severe aspects of anxiety or depression, and may include psychotic and behavioral disturbances:

- Varying degrees of anxiety, such as a very active mind, irritability, hyperactivity, agitation, restlessness, nervousness, distractible hyperactivity and panic attacks. In addition patients may experience vivid dreams and, occasionally, nightmares.
- Depressive features of mental impairment, memory lapses, diminished attention span, fluctuating depression.
- Emotional lability and in some patients hypomania.
- The pathological well-being (euphoria) or hyperactivity may produce a state of exhaustion, and profound fatigue or asthenia chiefly characterizes the picture.
- Erratic behaviour may include intermittent rage disorder and mild attention deficit disorder. Some patients become hyperirritable and combative, which can precipitate accidents or even assaultive behaviour.
- In more extreme cases features of psychosis, with delusions of persecution or delusions of reference, and pressure of speech may present themselves. Rarely, patients develop visual or auditory hallucinations or a frank psychosis, and may appear schizophrenic, lose touch with reality and become delirious, Such psychotic symptoms may not completely clear up after the hyperthyroidism has been treated. Paranoia and paranoid-hallucinatory psychosis in hyperthyroidism usually have a manic disposition and it is therefore often not clear if the patient is experiencing a paranoid psychosis with depressive streaks, or a depression that has paranoid streaks.

Treatment of hyperthyroidism typically leads to improvement in cognitive and behavioral impairments. Agitation, inattention, and frontal lobe impairment may improve more rapidly than other cognitive functions. However, several studies confirm that a substantial proportion of patients with hyperthyroidism have psychiatric disorders or mental symptoms and decreased quality of life even after successful treatment of their hyperthyroidism.

=== Effects on pre-existing psychiatric disorders ===
Patients with pre-existing psychiatric disorders, will experience a worsening of their usual symptoms, as observed by several studies. A study of 1999 found that Graves' disease exacerbated the symptoms of Tourette's disorder and attention-deficit hyperactivity disorder (ADHD), and points out that the lack of diagnosis of the Graves' disease compromised the efficacy of the treatment of these disorders. Patients who are known to have a convulsive disorder may become more difficult to control with the usual medications, and seizures may appear in patients who have never previously manifested such symptoms.

== Sub-clinical hyperthyroidism ==
In sub-clinical hyperthyroidism, serum TSH is abnormally low, but T4- and T3-levels fall within laboratory reference ranges. It primarily affects the skeleton and the cardiovascular system (abnormalities in other systems have also been reported), in a similar but less severe and less frequent way than overt hyperthyroidism does. It can alter cardiac function, with increased heart rate, increased left ventricular mass index, increased cardiac contractility, diastolic dysfunction, and induction of ectopic atrial beats. Long-term mild excess of thyroid hormone can thus cause impaired cardiac reserve and exercise capacity. In a large population-based study of 2008, the odds of having poorer cognitive function were greater for sub-clinical hyperthyroidism than for stroke, diabetes mellitus, and Parkinson's disease. Sub-clinical hyperthyroidism might modestly increase the risk of cognitive impairment and dementia. Subclinical hyperthyroidism in pregnancy is associated with an increased risk of pre-eclampsia, low birth weight, miscarriage and preterm birth. Propylthiouracil is the preferred treatment of hyperthyroidism (both overt and subclinical) in the first trimester of pregnancy as it is associated with less birth defects than methimazole.

A possible explanation for the mental symptoms of sub-clinical thyroid disease, might be found in the fact that the brain has among the highest expression of THR's, and that neurons are often more sensitive than other tissues to thyroid abnormalities, including sub-clinical hyperthyroidism and thyrotoxicosis. In a 1996 survey study respondents reported a significant decline in memory, attention, planning, and overall productivity from the period 2 years prior to Graves' symptoms onset to the period when hyperthyroid. Also, hypersensitivity of the central nervous system to low-grade hyperthyroidism can result in an anxiety disorder before other Graves' disease symptoms emerge. E.g., panic disorder has been reported to precede Graves' hyperthyroidism by 4 to 5 years in some cases, although it is not known how frequently this occurs.

However, while clinical hyperthyroidism is associated with frank neuropsychological and affective alterations, the occurrence of these alterations and their treatment in mild and sub-clinical hyperthyroidism remains a controversial issue. Regardless of the inconsistent findings, a 2007 study by Andersen et al. states that the distinction between sub-clinical and overt thyroid disease is in any case somewhat arbitrary. Sub-clinical hyperthyroidism has been reported in 63% of euthyroid Graves' disease, but only in 4% of cases where Graves' disease was in remission.

Subclinical hyperthyroidism has an 8% risk of converting to overt hyperthyroidism at 1 year, and a 26% risk at 5 years.

== Children and adolescents ==
Hyperthyroidism has unique effects in children on growth and pubertal development, e.g. causing epiphyseal maturation. In growing children, accelerated bone growth from hyperthyroidism can increase osteogenesis in the short term, but generally results in short-stature adults compared with the predicted heights. Pubertal development tends to be delayed, or slowed. Girls who have undergone menarche may develop secondary amenorrhea. Hyperthyroidism is associated with high sex hormone-binding globulin (SHBG), which may result in high serum estradiol levels in girls and testosterone levels in boys. However, unbound or free levels of these hormones are decreased. Hyperthyroidism before the age of four may cause neurodevelopmental delay. A study by Segni et al. suggests that permanent brain damage can occur as a result of the illness.

Ophthalmopatic findings are more common but less severe in children (severe infiltrative exophthalmos is virtually unknown before mid-adolescence), but besides that, many of the typical clinical features of hyperthyroidism in children and adolescents are similar to those in adults. An important difference between children and adults with Graves' disease, is that children have not yet developed like adults have (psychological and physiological), and that they are a lot more dependent on their environment. The encephalopathy will have profound effects on children's developing personalities and developing relationship with their environment. Disturbments in bodily development further complicates matters. The consequences for the development and the somatic and psychological well-being of the child can be very radical and sometimes irreversible. The earlier a person is affected by thyroid disease, the more the development of personality is affected and the bigger the delay from their potential development level. The child gets behind in its cognitive, emotional and sexual growth, which, by itself, also influences its processing abilities of the endocrine disease.

Children with hyperthyroidism tend to have greater mood swings and disturbances of behavior, as compared with adults. Their attention span decreases, they are usually hyperactive and distractible, they sleep poorly, and their school performance deteriorates. Because devastating personality and emotional changes often appear in the child or adolescent with Graves' disease, many hyperthyroid children are (similar to many adults) referred to a developmental specialist or child psychiatrist before the presence of hyperthyroidism is suspected.

== Older patients ==
In older patients, emotional instability may be less evident, or depression may occur, and the symptoms and signs are manifestly circulatory. In many, the thyroid is not readily palpable. Symptoms such as rapid heart rate, shortness of breath on exertion, and edema may predominate. Older patients also tend to have more weight loss and less of an increase in appetite. Thus anorexia in this group is fairly frequent, as is constipation. Elderly patients may have what is called "apathetic thyrotoxicosis", a state in which they have less and less severe symptoms, except for weakness, depression and lethargy (making it even more prone to escape diagnosis).

== Graves' disease and work ==
Considering the many signs and symptoms, the generally delayed diagnosis, and the possibility of residual complaints after treatment, it is little wonder that a significant number of people with Graves' disease have difficulty keeping their job. One study found that of 303 patients successfully treated for hyperthyroidism (77% had Graves' disease) 53% dealt with lack of energy. About one-third were unable to resume their customary work, mainly due to persistent mental problems. In their 1986 study of 26 patients (10 years after successful treatment of hyperthyroidism), Perrild et al. note that four patients had been granted disability pensions on the basis of intellectual dysfunction. Between 2006 and 2008, Ponto et al. surveyed 250 Graves' disease patients. Of these, 36% were written off sick and 5% even had to take early retirement. In the same study, 34% of 400 questioned physicians reported treating patients with fully impaired earning capacity.

Patients can and do recover with appropriate therapy while continuing to work, but more rapid and certain progress is made if a period away from the usual occupation can be provided. Two important considerations are adequate rest and attention to nutrition.
