= Hyperthyroxinemia =

- Other names: Hyperthyroxinaemia
- Thyroxine
- Specialty: Endocrinology

Hyperthyroxinemia is a thyroid disease where the serum levels of thyroxine are higher than expected. Thyroxine or tetraiodothyronine (T4) is produced by the thyroid gland.

The term is sometimes used to refer to hyperthyroidism, but hyperthyroidism is a more general term.

When the level of thyroxine (T4) in the blood exceeds normal range, it can lead to symptoms such as irritability and unexplained weight loss.

Types include:

- Familial dysalbuminemic hyperthyroxinemia
- Familial euthyroid hyperthyroxinemia
- Thyroid hormone resistance syndrome
