= Toxic multinodular goitre =

Enlarged thyroid gland, causing symptoms of hyperthyroidism

Toxic multinodular goiter
- Other names: Toxic nodular goiter, Plummer's disease, multinodular toxic goiter, TMNG, MNTG
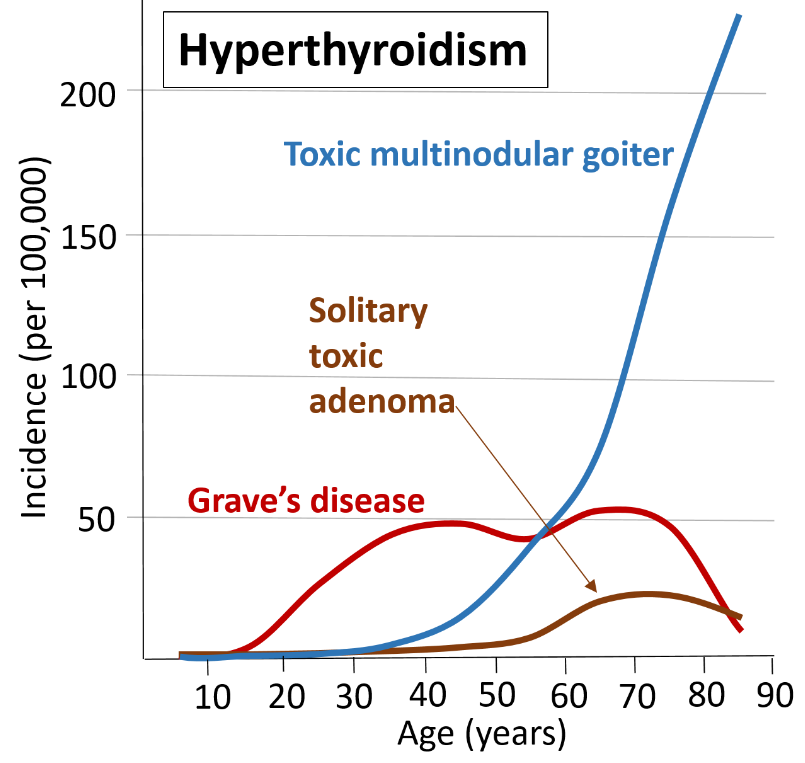
- Most common causes of hyperthyroidism by age.
- Specialty: Endocrinology

Toxic multinodular goiter (TMNG), also known as multinodular toxic goiter (MNTG), is an active multinodular goiter associated with hyperthyroidism.

It is a common cause of hyperthyroidism in which there is excess production of thyroid hormones from functionally autonomous thyroid nodules, which do not require stimulation from thyroid stimulating hormone (TSH).

Toxic multinodular goiter is the second most common cause of hyperthyroidism (after Graves' disease) in the developed world, whereas iodine deficiency is the most common cause of hypothyroidism in developing-world countries where the population is iodine-deficient. (Decreased iodine leads to decreased thyroid hormone.) However, iodine deficiency can cause goiter (thyroid enlargement); within a goitre, nodules can develop. Risk factors for toxic multinodular goiter include individuals over 60 years of age and being female.

== Signs and symptoms ==
Symptoms of toxic multinodular goitre are similar to that of hyperthyroidism, including:

- heat intolerance
- muscle weakness/wasting
- hyperactivity
- fatigue
- tremor
- irritability
- weight loss
- osteoporosis
- increased appetite
- non-painful goitre (swelling of the thyroid gland)
- tachycardia (high heart rate - above 100 beats per minute at rest in adults)
- tracheal compression
- exophthalmos

== Causes ==
Sequence of events:

1. Iodine deficiency leading to decreased T4 production.
2. Induction of thyroid cell hyperplasia due to low levels of T4. This accounts for the multinodular goitre appearance.
3. Increased replication predisposes to a risk of mutation in the TSH receptor.
4. If the mutated TSH receptor is constitutively active, it would then become 'toxic' and produces excess T3/T4 leading to hyperthyroidism.

== Diagnosis ==
Hyperthyroidism is diagnosed by evaluating symptoms and physical exam findings, and by conducting laboratory tests to confirm the presence of excess thyroid hormones. It is characterized by high levels of thyroid hormone in the blood along with a low level of thyroid-stimulating hormone (TSH). After diagnosing hyperthyroidism, a thyroid scan can be performed to determine the functionality of the thyroid gland using radioactive iodine. This scan can identify toxic nodules, which appear as a single area of overactivity, as well as toxic multinodular goiter, which presents with multiple areas of overactivity. In addition, a thyroid ultrasound can be conducted to better evaluate the presence of thyroid nodules.

Fine-needle aspiration for cytology is generally not indicated in an autonomously functioning thyroid nodule, as the risk of malignancy is low, and it is generally difficult to distinguishing between a benign lesion and a malignant lesion in such specimens. If thyroidectomy is performed, histopathology can corroborate the diagnosis. Toxic multinodular goiter more or less corresponds to diffuse or multinodular hyperplasia of the thyroid (Grave's disease also shows hyperplasia, but typically more prominent thickening of follicular linings):

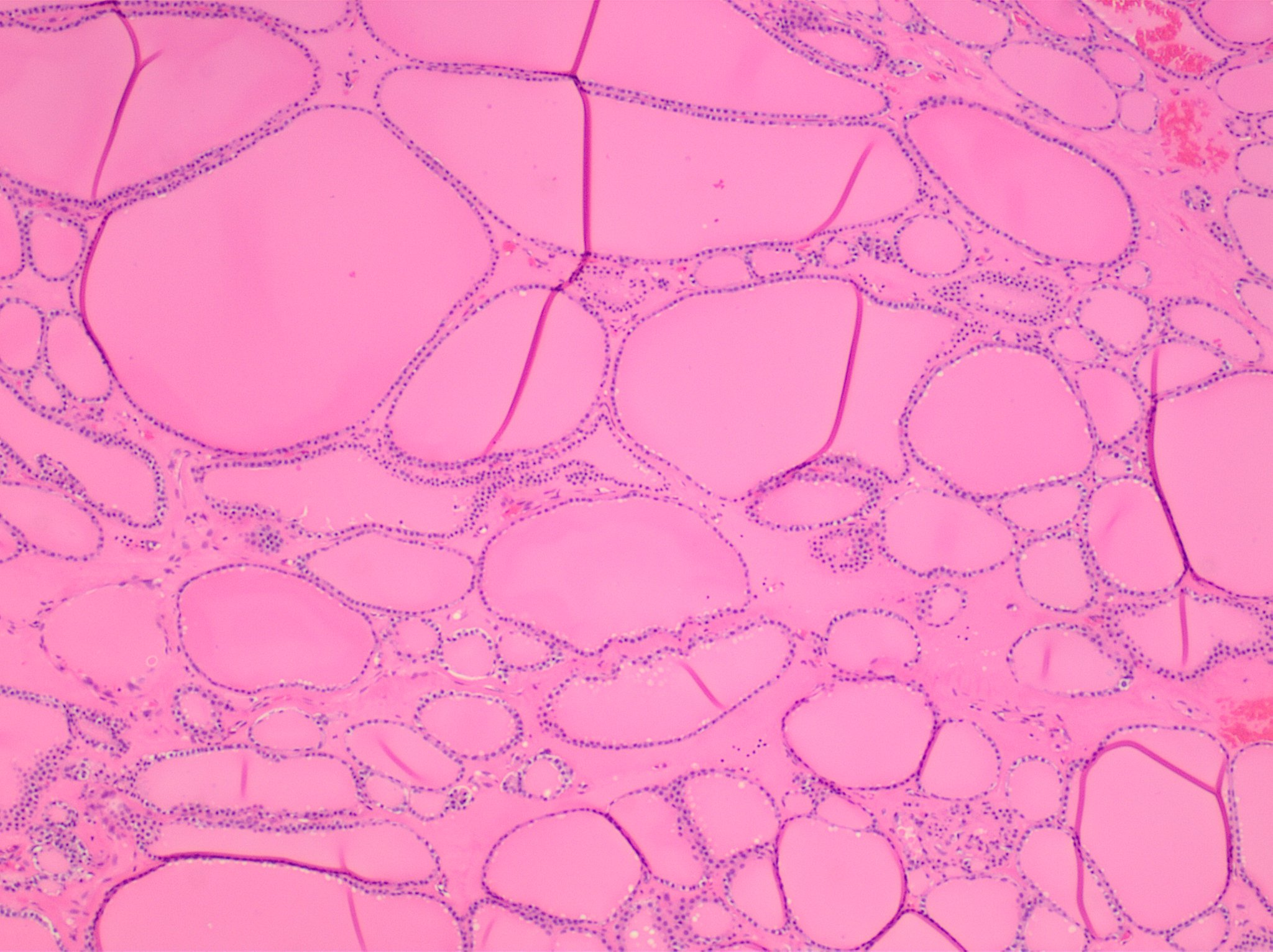
Diffuse thyroid hyperplasia typically shows variably sized follicles

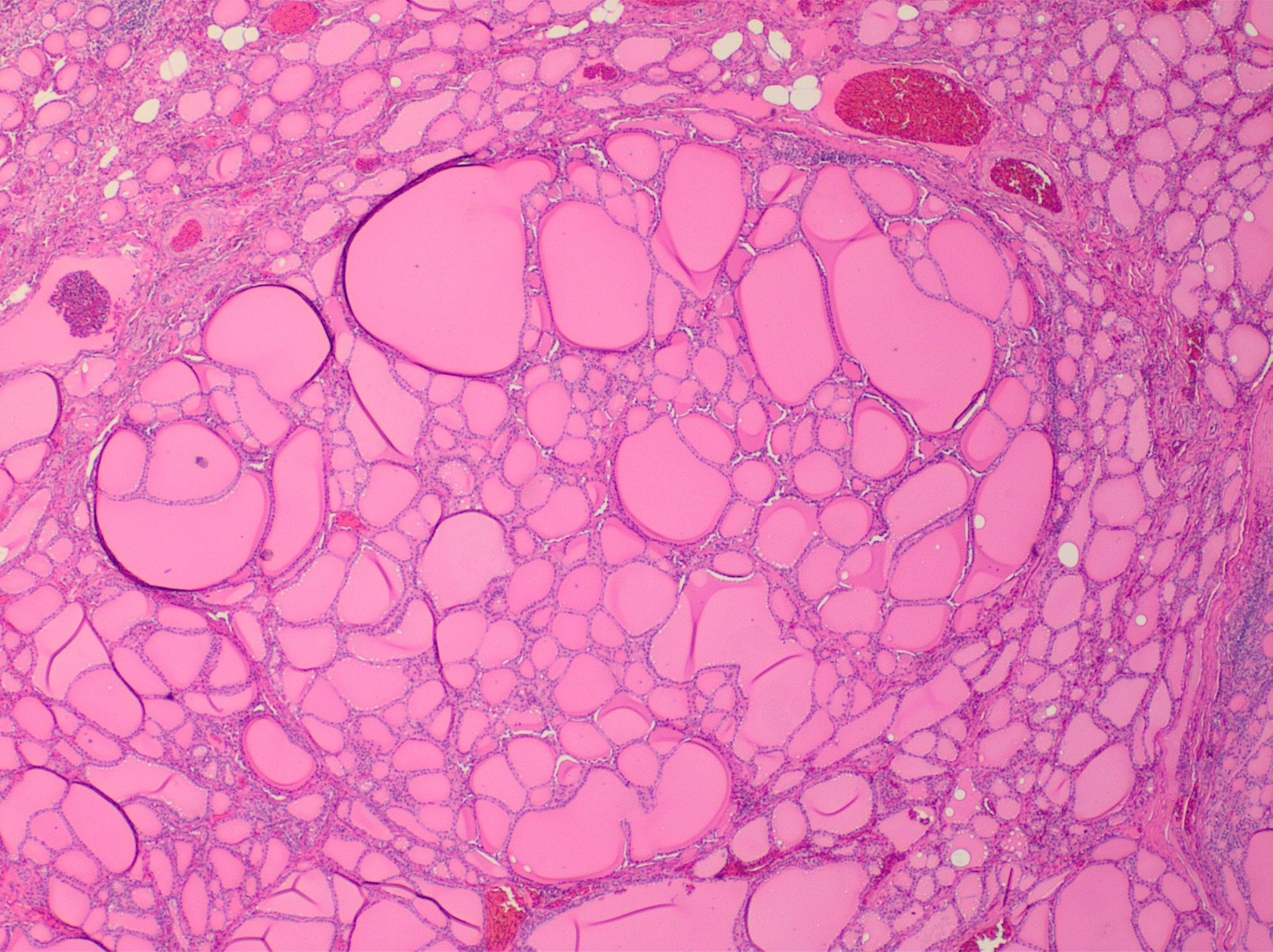
Thyroid hyperplasia with a hyperplastic nodule. It characteristically has no capsule (distinguishing it from thyroid adenoma or carcinoma).

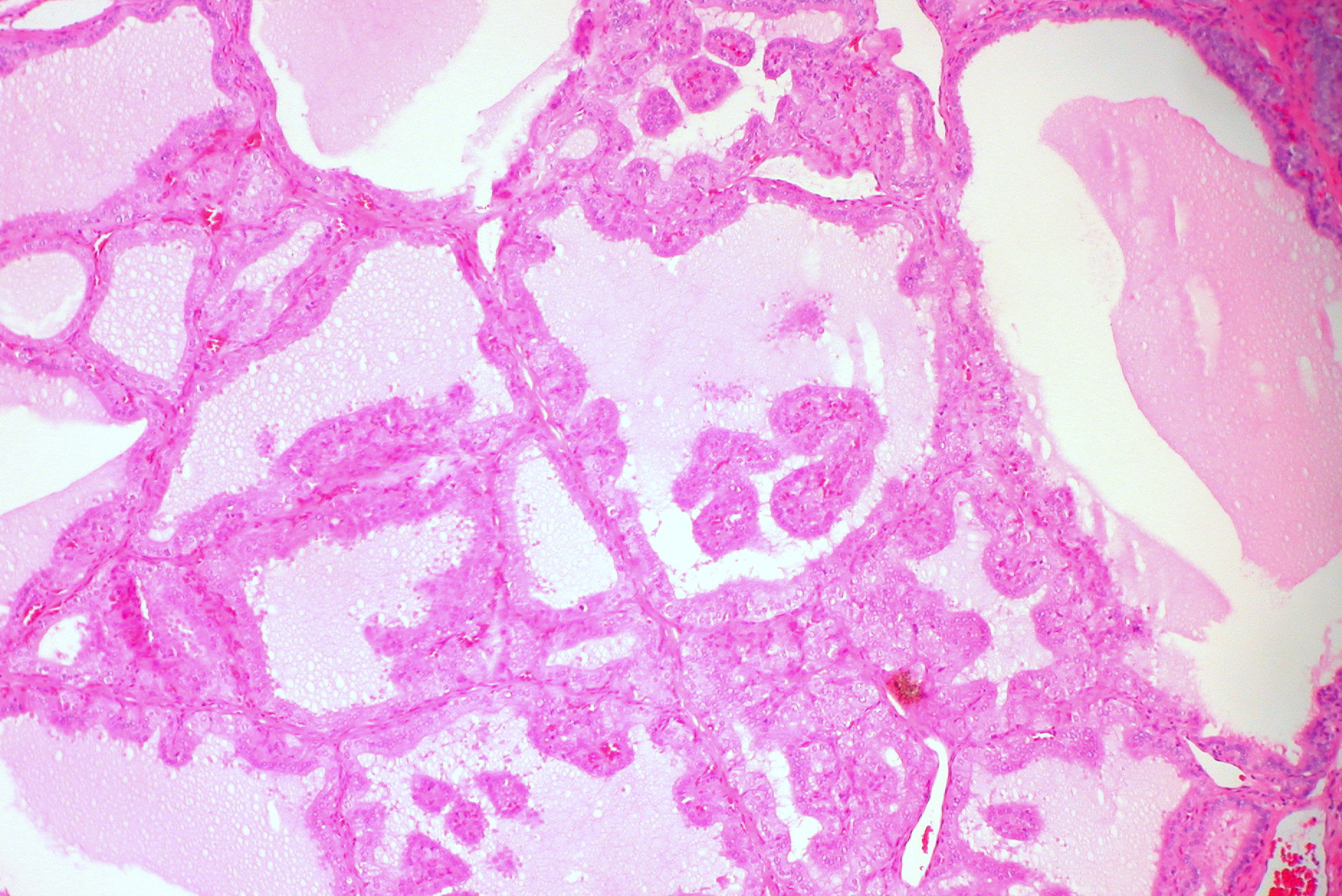
The follicular linings may be thickened, with papillary projections (but lack nuclear features of papillary thyroid carcinoma)

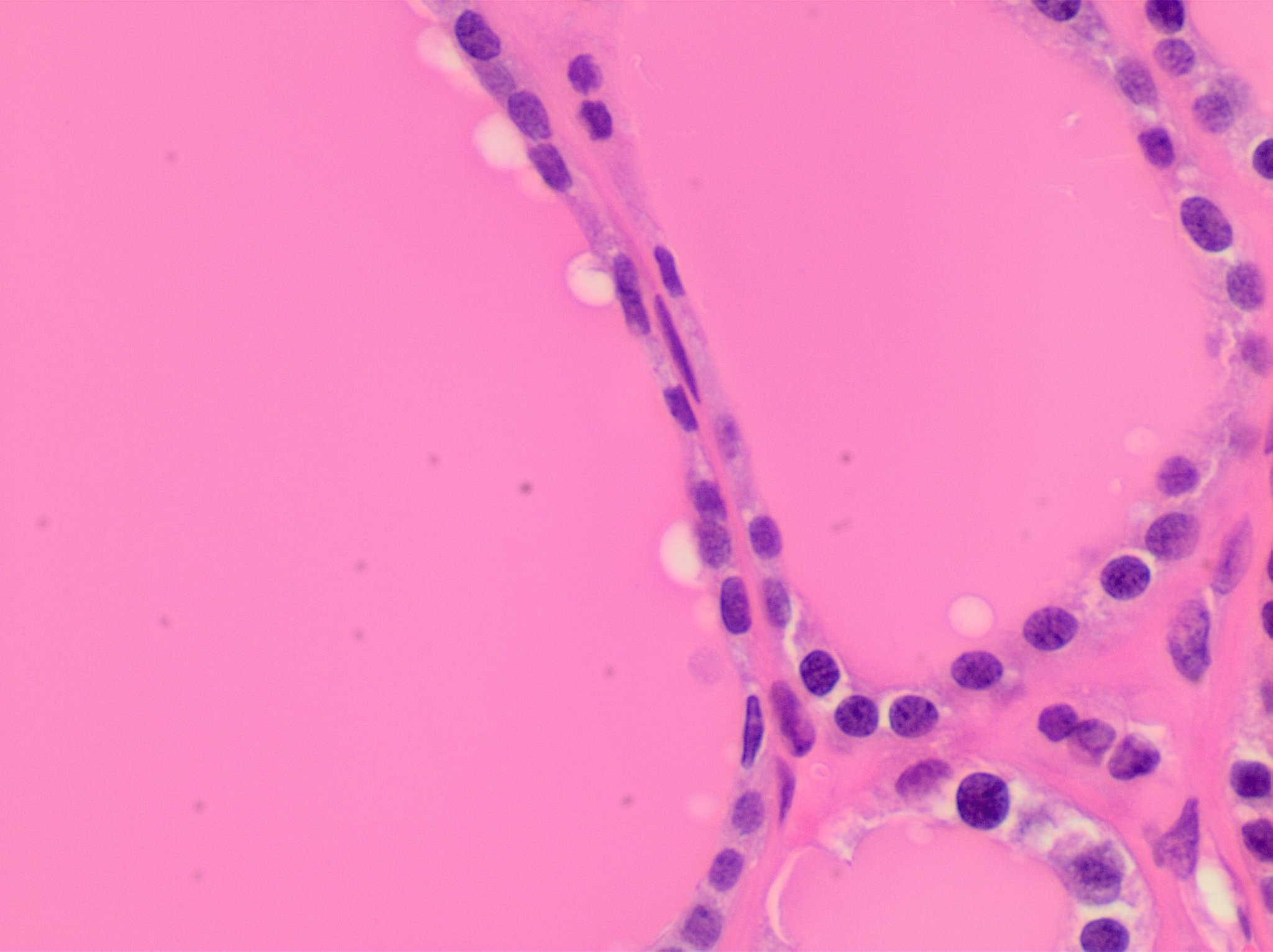
The epithelium may also be flattened by enlarged follicles.

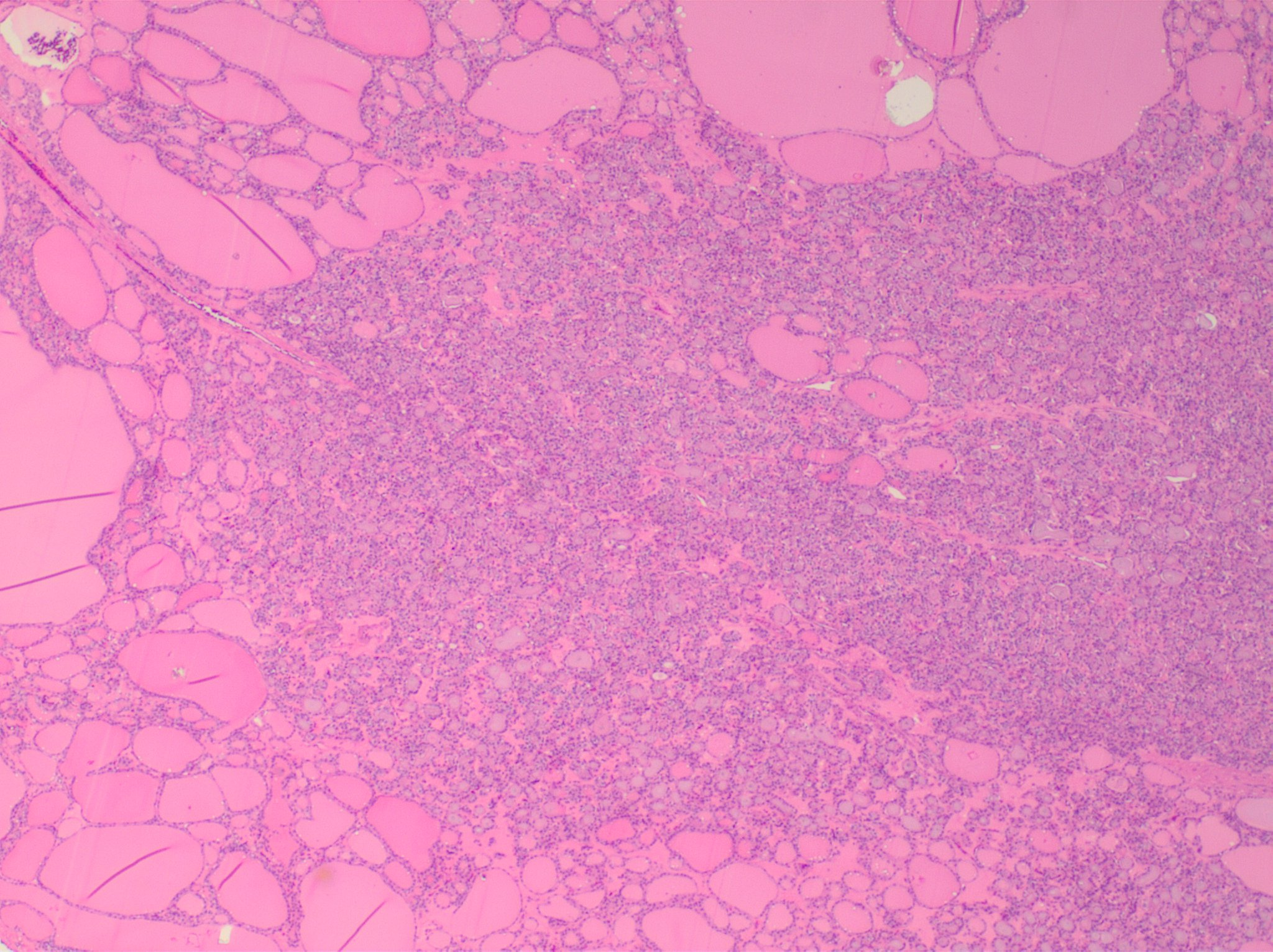
It can show hypercellular or microfollicular areas. There is no surrounding capsule (in contrast, a thyroid follicular adenoma or carcinoma is generally encapsulated).

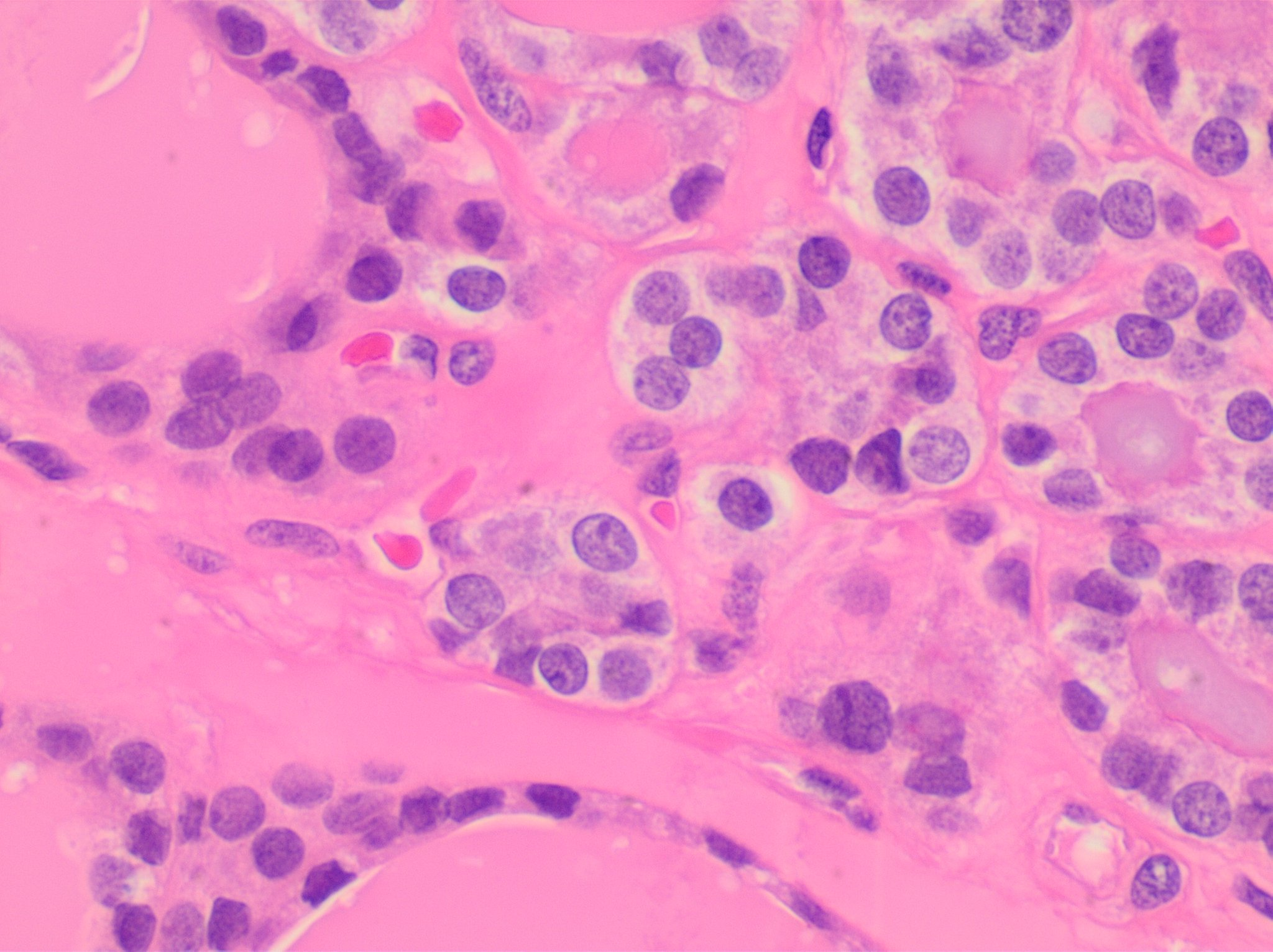
As shown in these microfollicles, it can have mildly enlarged nuclei with mildly clumped chromatin, and clear cytoplasms, but cellular characteristics of papillary thyroid carcinoma are absent.

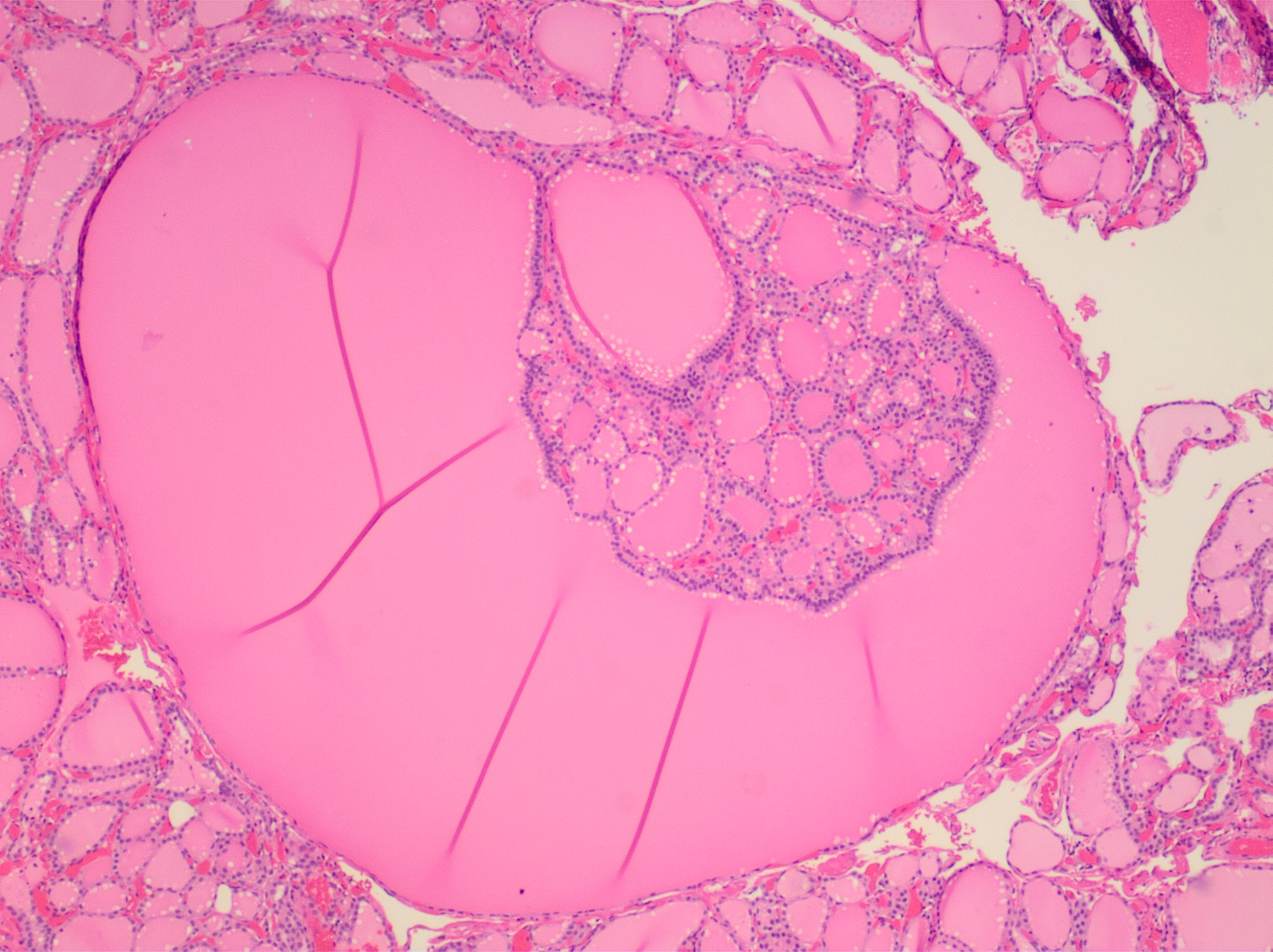
Thyroid hyperplasia with a Sanderson polster, which is a group of small follicles that protrude into the lumen of a larger follicle. It should not be confused for papillary projections.

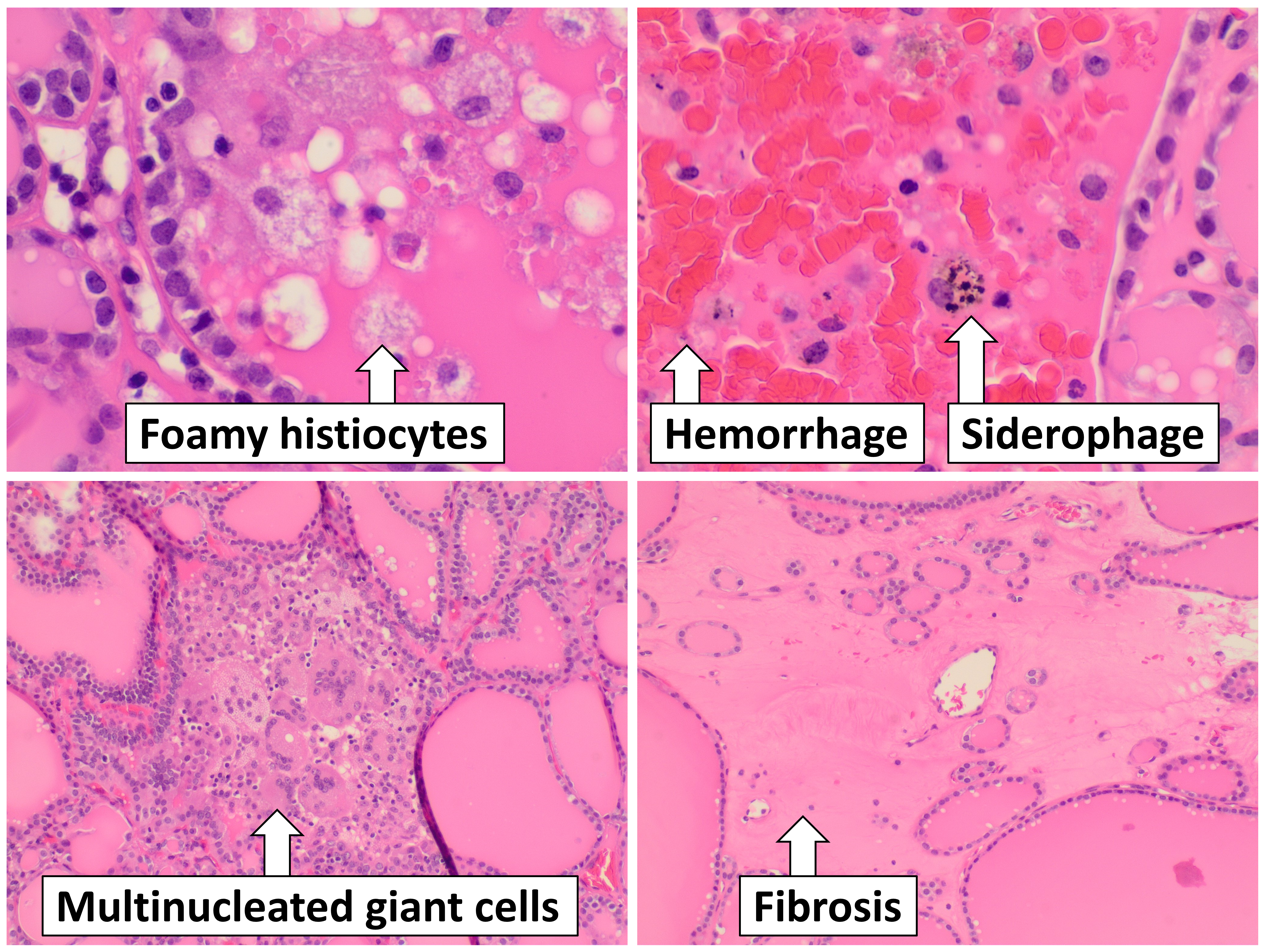
Various forms of degeneration are typically seen, with various forms pictured.

== Treatments ==
Toxic multinodular goiter can be treated with antithyroid medications such as propylthiouracil or methimazole, radioactive iodine, or with surgery. Another treatment option is injection of ethanol into the nodules.

A Cochrane review compared treatments using recombinant human thyrotropin-aided radioactive iodine to radioactive iodine alone. In this review it was found that the recombinant human thyrotropin-aided radioactive iodine appeared to lead to a greater reduction of thyroid volume at the increased risk of hypothyroidism. No conclusive data on changes in quality of life with either treatments were found.

== History ==
The usage of terminology for types of goiter has varied over the past century. Physicians and surgeons tend to differentiate among solitary-nodule goiter, multinodular goiter, and non-nodular goiter more thoroughly in recent decades than they formerly did. Thus some sources have described, or still describe, thyroid adenoma (toxic adenoma) as synonymous with toxic multinodular goiter, but other sources differentiate those two as single-nodule disease versus multinodular disease (respectively) with pathogenesis that is likely differing in most cases (e.g., single neoplastic cell clone versus multifocal or diffuse molecular metabolic change). The medical eponyms "Plummer disease" (named after American physician Henry Stanley Plummer) and "Parry disease" (named after English physician Caleb Hillier Parry) have been used to refer to toxic multinodular goiter, toxic adenoma, and toxic diffuse goiter (Graves' disease); the specific entity in each patient/case is not always clear retrospectively, especially in older literature. This is logical given that advanced medical imaging that can show what is happening at various places within a thyroid gland inside a living person (such as nuclear medicine imaging of radioiodine tracer uptake) was not available until after the 1940s.
