= Hyalinizing trabecular adenoma =

Hyalinizing trabecular adenoma (or Hyalinizing trabecular adenoma) is a subtype of thyroid adenoma.
