= Familial dysalbuminemic hyperthyroxinemia =

- Specialty: Endocrinology

Familial dysalbuminemic hyperthyroxinemia (FDH) rare genetic condition that is a common cause of euthyroid hyperthyroxinemia and is associated with mutations in the human serum albumin gene. It is an autosomal dominant condition that is often mistaken for resistance to thyroid hormone (RTH) syndromes or hyperthyroidism. FDH is characterized by high levels of thyroxine (T4) and normal levels of thyroid stimulating hormone (TSH). Due to the mutations in the albumin gene, an abnormal albumin protein binds thyroid hormones with a high affinity than normal. This explains why those with familial dysalbuminemic hyperthyroxinemia have increased T4 levels and normal TSH levels.

The structural formula of thyroxine (T4).

== Signs and symptoms ==
Familial dysalbuminemic hyperthyroxinemia is usually asymptomatic. The clinical features are not specific and vary from patient to patient. In some cases, symptoms such as those seen in hyperthyroidism have been recorded like: palpitations, weight loss, tremors, and anxiety.

== Cause ==
The mutations in the albumin gene cause an increase in T4 levels because the albumin now binds more readily to T4. Despite the increased levels of T4, TSH levels remain normal. Because of genetic sequencing, the following albumin gene variants have been recorded in patients with FSH: p.Arg218His (R218H), p.Arg218Pro (R218P), p.Arg218Ser (R218S), p.Arg222Ile (R222I), and p. Leu66Pro (L66P).

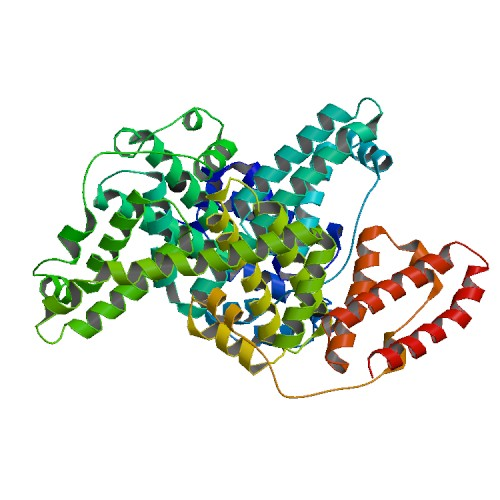
Albumin's structure.

== Pathophysiology ==
The pathophysiology of familial dysalbuminemic hyperthyroxinemia involves the mutation of the albumin gene, leading to increased binding of thyroid hormones, particularly T4, to albumin. This causes an elevation in total T4 levels without a corresponding increase in free T4, which is why those with this mutation have no clinical symptoms because their thyroid still functions normally.

== Diagnosis ==
Protein gel electrophoresis equipment.

Due to patients generally being asymptomatic, diagnosis of familial dysalbuminemic hyperthyroxinemia is usually made incidentally when abnormal thyroxine levels are detected during routine testing such as a thyroid function test. To be certain, gene sequencing could also be performed to confirm the diagnosis of FDH. This would also allow for the patient and providers to know which albumin gene variant that particular patient has. Protein electrophoresis can also be used to confirm a diagnosis of FDH. This test measures specific proteins in the blood and in the case of testing for FDH, albumin would be the protein that is isolated.

== Treatment/management ==
Due to patients being asymptomatic and euthyroid, treatment is not required for those with familial dysalbuminemic hyperthyroxinemia.

== Prognosis ==
The prognosis of those with FDH is favorable due to the patients being asymptomatic and not requiring treatment.

== Epidemiology ==
In the Caucasian population, the prevalence of familial dysalbuminemic hyperthyroxinemia is estimated at 1 in 10,000 individuals. The prevalence is higher in those of Hispanic origin compared to those in populations in Venezuela, France, and Denmark.
