= Diabetes self-management =

Challenges to diabetes self management

Diabetes self-management refers to the ongoing process in which individuals with diabetes actively participate in managing their condition through lifestyle choices, medication adherence, blood glucose monitoring, and education, aimed at maintaining optimal blood sugar levels and preventing complications. Maintaining Healthy lifestyle choices, through planned and established behavioural changes, is essential to achieve balanced glucose levels and delay and treat type 2 diabetes mellitus. Numerous factors influence the patient's ability to comply with diabetes self-management. This includes encouragement and assistance from family members, individual resolution, effective health care provider patient, communication, use of health technological interventions such as mobile phone applications, self-management education, and a close relative of the family familiar with diabetes self-management.

Diabetes is a chronic disease which affected over 537 million adults worldwide in 2021; it is predicted to reach 643 million people by 2030. It is a global health burden and improving the health outcomes for people with diabetes is critical to reducing the economic and human burden of diabetes. Self-management is the cornerstone for successful health outcomes in diabetes patients as there is a positive association between self-management behaviour and care outcomes. Self-management stresses the importance of the role of an individual and their responsibility in developing skilled behaviours to manage one's own illness.

== Self-management activities ==
Healthcare organisations are increasingly focusing on providing diabetes self-management education and support programs to enable diabetes patients to effective self-management. Diabetes patients face daily challenges due to the impact of their decisions on their health outcomes. Diabetes self-management helps diabetes patients to make better decisions and change their behaviour to achieve better outcomes.The ability to perform basic activities of daily living, such as bathing, dressing, walking, and climbing stairs, is positively associated with performing daily self-management activities, such as physical activity or foot care. Diabetes self-management activities mainly consist of seven self-care behaviours. They are healthy eating, monitoring indicators of diabetes, physical activity, taking medication, healthy coping, and problem-solving.

=== Foot care ===
Diabetes patients with peripheral neuropathy and peripheral artery disease are at risk of developing foot ulcers and infection. Poor knowledge about self-care increases the risk of amputation. Adoption of suitable preventative measures and early treatment of diabetic foot problems are important components of diabetes foot care. Good knowledge and practice regarding diabetes foot care can reduce the risk of foot complications and amputation. Regular examination of the foot is one of the fundamental steps to modifying the foot risk factors thereby reducing the risk of ulceration and amputation. Footwear tailored to the specific pathology of the patient can enable conservative management of the foot including debridement of the callus. Appropriate footwear can reduce abnormal pressure, reduce the rate of formation callus and ulcers and protect the foot from external trauma.

=== Blood glucose monitoring ===
Regular monitoring of blood glucose and optimal glucose control is a major part of diabetes self-management. Diabetes patients need to be capable of testing blood sugar at home at the recommended frequency. Frequent self- monitoring of blood glucose and record keeping is key to identifying the possibility of hypoglycemia. Diabetes patients should be able to know how to respond when blood sugar levels are too high or too low. Affordable and easily accessible video based training to enhance insulin administration skills, insulin dosing regimens, and home blood glucose monitoring in individuals with type 2 diabetes mellitus can prevent errors, complications and help individuals with diabetes monitor glucose at home.

=== Medication ===
Effective medication is the cornerstone of the proper treatment of diseases. Many patients fail to take the medication as prescribed and many patients prematurely discontinue their medication. Poor medication adherence in patients with diabetes is a costly public health challenge in many healthcare systems. Non-adherence to medication leads to poor treatment outcomes and the progression of diseases and complications. The medication adherence of type 1 and type 2 diabetes patients assessed using self-report, pill counts, electronic monitoring devices and medication possession ratio found that the medication adherence rates ranged from 31% to 87%. The medication adherence of diabetes patients is also measured by persistence which is defined by the proportion of patients who remained in treatment for a predetermined period and the mean number of days till discontinuation of treatment. The persistence rates ranged from 16% to 63% at 12 months and ranged from 29% to 70%.

=== Physical activity ===
Physical activity has a favourable influence on the health and well-being of diabetes patients as it achieves physiological changes, including improved overall glycemic control, liver insulin sensitivity, muscle glucose uptake and utilisation and overcomes the metabolic abnormalities related to type 2 diabetes. Diabetes patients can undertake light to moderate physical activity. The type of physical activity that can be performed by diabetes patients needs to be determined after consultations with health care providers. The physical activities recommended for diabetes patients include brisk walking, recreational games and leisure time activities. The most benefit of physical activity happens in the early progression of the disease.

=== Healthy eating habits ===
A healthy diet is one component of the management of diabetes. Dietary self-care behaviours include eating a low-saturated fat diet, making choices based on the glycemic index of food, and controlling the amount of carbohydrates in food. Sticking to the eating plan and following the diet plan when eating from a restaurant or when feeling stressed is a major challenge for diabetes patients.

== Recommended practices and specific behaviours ==
Understanding the levels (recommended practices) and patterns (specific behaviours) of primary daily diabetes self-management from a heterogeneous sample population is essential to devise suitable interventions to enhance the daily diabetes management of diabetes patients. Many of the diabetes self-management data involve only a small and highly selected sample, which does not represent the minorities and disadvantaged communities. The study conducted on a heterogeneous sample of population including minorities found that self-management levels increase with age. The same study found that retired individuals and homemakers have better self-management than employed individuals.

== Barriers to effective self-management ==
Diabetes patients need to actively self-manage their diseases in everyday life for good diabetes outcomes. However, there are certain barriers to the effective day-to-day management of the disease. These barriers influence the patient's ability to self-manage. This section identified the main barriers to the effective self-management of diabetes.

=== Financial constraints ===
Financial constraints or poverty is a barrier to effective self-management as it prevents access to food, healthcare, medication and information. The financial barriers affect the patient's ability to access prescription medication and self-management supplies such as glucometers and glucose testing strips. The most significant impact of lack of financial resources is on the food consumption pattern, resulting in a vicious cycle of high carbohydrate consumption and hyperglycaemia. Diabetes patients with limited financial resources often report that they find it difficult to purchase adequate food and it becomes impossible to buy different food for the family. Financial difficulties cause diabetes care to become a problem of least importance as they have more pressing needs such as feeding the family and repaying loans. When it comes to buying medicines for diabetes management, people from poor financial backgrounds choose food over medicine. To save costs, people from poor economic backgrounds alter the prescribed dosage of medication and medication is often taken with diabetes complications or the development of co-morbid illness.

=== Norms and belief system ===
The attitude towards self-care behaviour is influenced by the local belief systems and social norms. Patients who attribute diabetes control to god are less likely to self-manage and control their sugar intake. A study found that subjective norms attributed to 49% of the variance in the intent to perform diabetes-related self-management.

An individual's and their family's beliefs about diabetes influence how they make sense of their disease and make efforts to manage their illness. For example, individuals who are not adhering to the dietary intake shared the view that their decision to not follow the required dietary pattern is because they believe that their family, friends and peers would not approve of their diet. Inadequate family support and cultural beliefs prevent diabetes patients from adhering to a diet with low-saturated fatty acids. Family members can reinforce the individual's adherence to medication, diet, glucose monitoring, and other self-care activities. The perceptions about the importance of self-management and the understanding of the disease influence the self-management behavioural attitude. Understanding the perceived benefits of diabetes self-management led to its acceptance.

In Subsaharan Africa, diabetes patients face social stigma from family and community members from diabetes and diabetes-related self-management requirements which prevent diabetes-related self-care. A study found that when there is diabetes that runs in the family, it becomes a family affair and participants normalise and downplay the seriousness of the disease.

Gender-based family roles prevent adhering to the medication. In a study, woman responsible for house duties were found to have inadequate time to visit health facilities resulting in their ignoring their health care needs such as diabetes management.

=== Low knowledge ===
Diabetes knowledge has a significant influence on the self-care and glycemic control of a diabetes patient. The lower knowledge about diabetes can affect diabetes management. Studies have found that patient's lack of knowledge and poor self-care practice is increasing the severity of diabetes every year. The level of education is a factor that has a positive correlation with self-care knowledge.

=== Stigma ===
Family support is highly beneficial for effective self-care. Diabetes-related stigma leads to a lack of family support and poor diabetes-related self-management behaviours. Diabetes related stigma is also present in healthcare. Diabetes patients face stigma, criticism and judgment in the healthcare communication instead of the required care and support. This experience of stigma leads to disengagement from diabetes self-management.

=== Inadequate support ===
Diabetes patients expressed dissatisfaction with the attitude of healthcare professionals as they directly wrote prescription and directions without a proper conversation with the patients. This prevents patients from asking lingering questions about their health conditions and management. A study that examined a self-management support program that integrated education on diabetes and behavioural causes, self-tailoring and sustainable behavioural changes in diet, medication adherence, stress management and exercise was identified to significantly improve the diabetes self-care of type 2 diabetes patients. This study found the positive impact of enhancing the diabetes patients' knowledge, awareness and understanding of diabetes and self-care to promote behavioural changes for better health outcomes.

Inadequate coordination between the health care providers and diabetes patients is a major barrier to properly implementing the care guidelines. Lack of collaboration and coordination leads to information conflict affecting the quality of self-management. The diabetes patients who were identified to develop healthy diabetes management habits had a supportive patient-provider relationship. People from economically disadvantaged backgrounds can have limited access to care which is one reason for inadequate coordination between healthcare providers and patients.

== Role of healthcare professionals ==
Healthcare professionals play a crucial role in diabetes self-management. Diabetes patients rely on health care professionals to obtain information and support in developing an individualised self-management plan. Self-management goals and recommendations given by health care professionals were identified to have a significant positive impact on the eating habits and physical activity of diabetes patients. Lack of proper emphasis on self-management may suggest to diabetes patients that self-management is either less important or even unimportant for diabetes management. Diabetes self-management leads to better outcomes when individuals have regular follow-up and are provided with personalised feedback.
