= High-output heart failure =

- Specialty: Cardiology

High-output heart failure is a heart condition that occurs when the cardiac output is higher than normal because of increased peripheral demand. There is a circulatory overload which may lead to pulmonary edema secondary to an elevated diastolic pressure in the left ventricle. These individuals usually have a normal systolic function but symptoms are those of heart failure. With time, this overload causes systolic failure. Ultimately cardiac output can be reduced to very low levels.

It may occur in situations with an increased blood volume, morbid obesity, from excess of water and salt (kidney pathology, excess of fluid or blood administration, treatment with retaining water steroids), chronic and severe anemia, large arteriovenous fistula or multiple small arteriovenous shunts as in HHT or Paget's disease of bone, some forms of severe liver or kidney disorders, hyperthyroidism, and wet beriberi, and acutely in septic shock, especially caused by Gram-negative bacteria.
