= Hyperthyroidism =

Excessive production of thyroid hormone

- Other names: Overactive thyroid, hyperthyreosis
- Triiodothyronine (T_{3}, pictured) and thyroxine (T_{4}) are both forms of thyroid hormone.
- Specialty: Endocrinology
- Symptoms: Irritability, muscle weakness, sleeping problems, fast heartbeat, heat intolerance, diarrhea, enlargement of the thyroid, weight loss
- Complications: Thyroid storm
- Usual onset: 20–50 years old
- Causes: Graves' disease, multinodular goiter, toxic adenoma, inflammation of the thyroid, eating too much iodine, too much synthetic thyroid hormone
- Diagnostic method: Based on symptoms and confirmed by blood tests
- Treatment: Radioiodine therapy, medications, thyroid surgery
- Medication: Beta blockers, methimazole
- Frequency: 1.2% (US)
- Deaths: Rare directly, unless thyroid storm occurs; associated with increased mortality if untreated (1.23 HR)

Hyperthyroidism is a endocrine disease in which the thyroid gland produces excessive amounts of thyroid hormones. Thyrotoxicosis is a condition that occurs due to elevated levels of thyroid hormones of any cause and therefore includes hyperthyroidism. Some, however, use the terms interchangeably. Signs and symptoms vary between people and may include irritability, muscle weakness, sleeping problems, a fast heartbeat, heat intolerance, diarrhea, enlargement of the thyroid, hand tremor, and weight loss. Symptoms are typically less severe in the elderly and during pregnancy. An uncommon but life-threatening complication is thyroid storm in which an event such as an infection results in worsening symptoms such as confusion and a high temperature; this often results in death. The opposite is hypothyroidism, when the thyroid gland does not make enough thyroid hormone.

Graves' disease is the cause of about 50% to 80% of the cases of hyperthyroidism in the United States. Other causes include multinodular goiter, toxic adenoma, inflammation of the thyroid, eating too much iodine, and too much synthetic thyroid hormone. A less common cause is a pituitary adenoma. The diagnosis may be suspected based on signs and symptoms and then confirmed with blood tests. Typically blood tests show a low thyroid stimulating hormone (TSH) and raised T_{3} or T_{4}. Radioiodine uptake by the thyroid, thyroid scan, and measurement of antithyroid autoantibodies (thyroidal thyrotropin receptor antibodies are positive in Graves' disease) may help determine the cause.

Treatment depends partly on the cause and severity of the disease. There are three main treatment options: radioiodine therapy, medications, and thyroid surgery. Radioiodine therapy involves taking iodine-131 by mouth, which is then concentrated in and destroys the thyroid over weeks to months. The resulting hypothyroidism is treated with synthetic thyroid hormone. Medications such as beta blockers may control the symptoms, and anti-thyroid medications such as methimazole may temporarily help people while other treatments are having an effect. Surgery to remove the thyroid is another option. This may be used in those with very large thyroids or when cancer is a concern. In the United States, hyperthyroidism affects about 1.2% of the population. Worldwide, hyperthyroidism affects 2.5% of adults. It occurs between two and ten times more often in women. Onset is commonly between 20 and 50 years of age. Overall, the disease is more common in those over the age of 60 years. Thyroid disorders affect kidney function markers and may also affect underlying kidney function. Studies suggest that creatinine may decrease in hyperthyroidism and increase in hypothyroidism, whereas cystatin C shows the opposite pattern. Therefore, the effect of thyroid disorders on underlying kidney function remains debated, and it is unclear whether these changes primarily reflect alterations in kidney markers or changes in underlying kidney function.

== Signs and symptoms ==
Hyperthyroidism may be asymptomatic or present with significant symptoms. Some of the symptoms of hyperthyroidism include nervousness, irritability, increased perspiration, heart racing, hand tremors, anxiety, trouble sleeping, thinning of the skin, fine brittle hair, and muscular weakness—especially in the upper arms and thighs. More frequent bowel movements may occur, and diarrhea is common. Weight loss, sometimes significant, may occur despite a good appetite (though 10% of people with a hyperactive thyroid experience weight gain), vomiting may occur, and, for women, menstrual flow may lighten and menstrual periods may occur less often, or with longer cycles than usual.

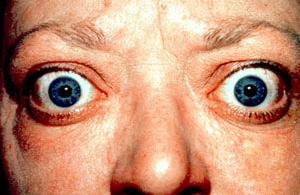
Exophthalmos seen in Graves' ophthalmopathy

The thyroid hormone is critical to the normal function of cells. In excess, it both overstimulates metabolism and disrupts the normal functioning of the sympathetic nervous system, causing speeding up of various body systems and symptoms resembling an overdose of epinephrine (adrenaline). These include fast heartbeat and symptoms of palpitations, nervous system tremor such as of the hands and anxiety symptoms, digestive system hypermotility, unintended weight loss, and, in lipid panel blood tests, a lower and sometimes unusually low serum cholesterol.

Major clinical signs of hyperthyroidism include weight loss (often accompanied by an increased appetite), anxiety, heat intolerance, hair loss, muscle aches, weakness, fatigue, hyperactivity, irritability, high blood sugar, excessive urination, excessive thirst, delirium, tremor, pretibial myxedema (in Graves' disease), emotional lability, and sweating. Panic attacks, inability to concentrate, and memory problems may also occur. Psychosis and paranoia, common during thyroid storm, are rare with milder hyperthyroidism. Many persons will experience complete remission of symptoms 1 to 2 months after a euthyroid state is obtained, with a marked reduction in anxiety, sense of exhaustion, irritability, and depression. Some individuals may have an increased rate of anxiety or persistence of affective and cognitive symptoms for several months to up to 10 years after a euthyroid state is established. In addition, those with hyperthyroidism may present with a variety of physical symptoms such as palpitations and abnormal heart rhythms (the notable ones being atrial fibrillation), shortness of breath (dyspnea), loss of libido, amenorrhea, nausea, vomiting, diarrhea, gynecomastia and feminization. Long term untreated hyperthyroidism can lead to osteoporosis. These classic symptoms may not be present often in the elderly.

Bone loss, which is associated with overt but not subclinical hyperthyroidism, may occur in 10 to 20% of patients. This may be due to an increase in bone remodelling and a decrease in bone density, which increases fracture risk. It is more common in postmenopausal women; less so in younger women and men. Bone disease related to hyperthyroidism was first described by Frederick von Recklinghausen in 1891; he described the bones of a woman who died of hyperthyroidism as appearing "worm-eaten".

Neurological manifestations can include tremors, chorea, myopathy, and in some susceptible individuals (in particular of Asian descent) periodic paralysis. An association between thyroid disease and myasthenia gravis has been recognized. Thyroid disease, in this condition, is autoimmune in nature, and approximately 5% of people with myasthenia gravis also have hyperthyroidism. Myasthenia gravis rarely improves after thyroid treatment and the relationship between the two entities is becoming better understood over the past 15 years.

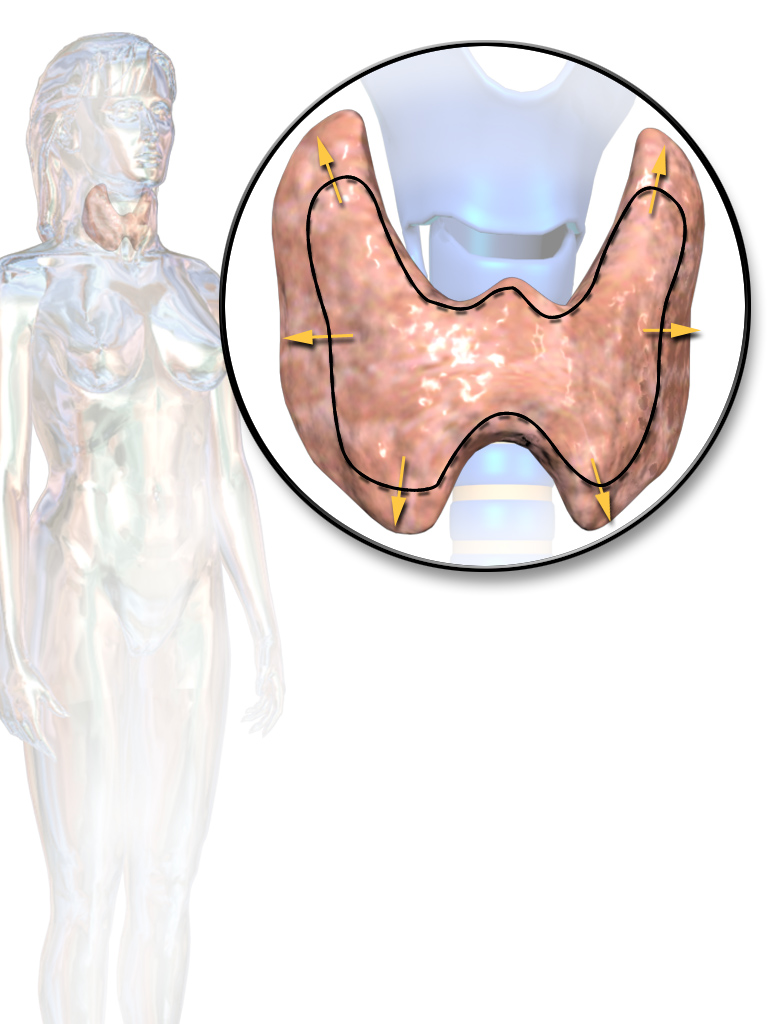
Illustration depicting enlarged thyroid that may be associated with hyperthyroidism

In Graves' disease, ophthalmopathy may cause the eyes to look enlarged because the eye muscles swell and push the eye forward. Sometimes, one or both eyes may bulge. Some have swelling of the front of the neck from an enlarged thyroid gland (a goiter).

Minor ocular (eye) signs, which may be present in any type of hyperthyroidism, are eyelid retraction ("stare"), extraocular muscle weakness, and lid-lag. In hyperthyroid stare (Dalrymple sign) the eyelids are retracted upward more than normal (the normal position is at the superior corneoscleral limbus, where the "white" of the eye begins at the upper border of the iris). Extraocular muscle weakness may present with double vision. In lid-lag (von Graefe's sign), when the person tracks an object downward with their eyes, the eyelid fails to follow the downward-moving iris, and the same type of upper globe exposure which is seen with lid retraction occurs, temporarily. These signs disappear with treatment of the hyperthyroidism.

Neither of these ocular signs should be confused with exophthalmos (protrusion of the eyeball), which occurs specifically and uniquely in hyperthyroidism caused by Graves' disease (note that not all exophthalmos is caused by Graves' disease, but when present with hyperthyroidism is diagnostic of Graves' disease). This forward protrusion of the eyes is due to immune-mediated inflammation in the retro-orbital (eye socket) fat. Exophthalmos, when present, may exacerbate hyperthyroid lid-lag and stare.

=== Thyroid storm ===
Thyroid storm is a severe form of thyrotoxicosis characterized by rapid and often irregular heartbeat, high temperature, vomiting, diarrhea, and mental agitation. Symptoms may not be typical in the young, old, or pregnant. It usually occurs due to untreated hyperthyroidism and can be provoked by infections. It is a medical emergency and requires hospital care to control the symptoms rapidly. The mortality rate in thyroid storm is 3.6-17%, usually due to multi-organ system failure.

=== Hypothyroidism ===
Hyperthyroidism due to certain types of thyroiditis can eventually lead to hypothyroidism (a lack of thyroid hormone), as the thyroid gland is damaged. Also, radioiodine treatment of Graves' disease often eventually leads to hypothyroidism. Such hypothyroidism may be diagnosed with thyroid hormone testing and treated by oral thyroid hormone supplementation.

== Causes ==
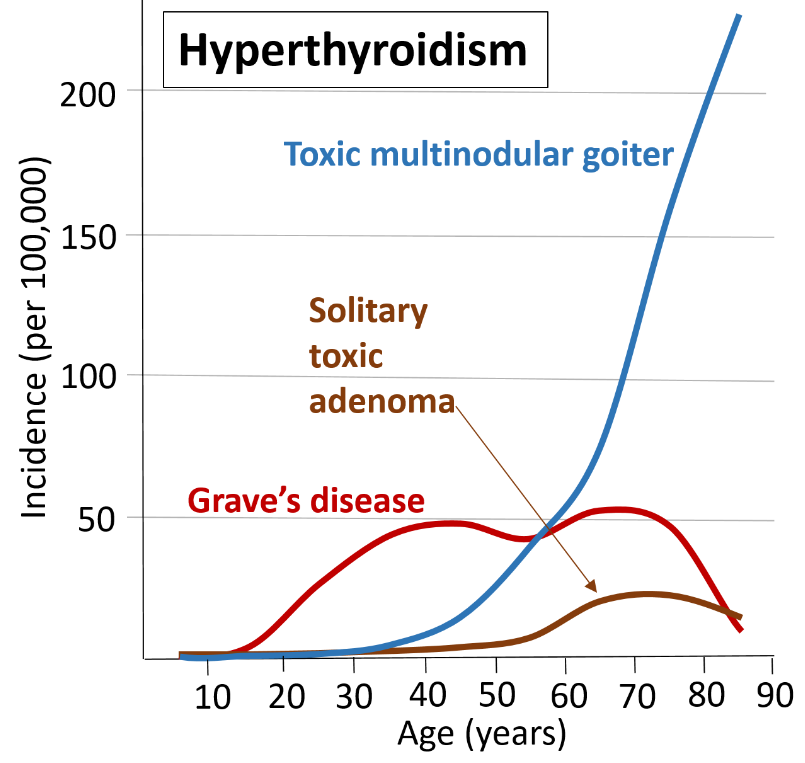
Most common causes of hyperthyroidism by age.

There are several causes of hyperthyroidism. Most often, the entire gland is overproducing thyroid hormone. Less commonly, a single nodule is responsible for the excess hormone secretion, called a "hot" nodule. Thyroiditis (inflammation of the thyroid) can also cause hyperthyroidism. Functional thyroid tissue producing an excess of thyroid hormone occurs in a number of clinical conditions.

The major causes in humans are:

- Graves' disease. An autoimmune disease (usually, the most common cause with 50–80% worldwide, although this varies substantially with location- i.e., 47% in Switzerland (Horst et al., 1987) to 90% in the USA (Hamburger et al. 1981)). Thought to be due to varying levels of iodine in the diet. It is eight times more common in females than males and often occurs in young females, around 20 to 40 years of age.
- Toxic thyroid adenoma (the most common cause in Switzerland, 53%, thought to be atypical due to a low level of dietary iodine in this country)
- Toxic multinodular goiter

High blood levels of thyroid hormones (most accurately termed hyperthyroxinemia) can occur for several other reasons:

- Inflammation of the thyroid is called thyroiditis. There are several different kinds of thyroiditis, including Hashimoto's thyroiditis (Hypothyroidism immune-mediated), and subacute thyroiditis (de Quervain's). These may be initially associated with secretion of excess thyroid hormone but usually progress to gland dysfunction and, thus, to hormone deficiency and hypothyroidism.
- Oral consumption of excess thyroid hormone tablets is possible (surreptitious use of thyroid hormone), as is the rare event of eating ground beef or pork contaminated with thyroid tissue, and thus thyroid hormones (termed hamburger thyrotoxicosis or alimentary thyrotoxicosis). Pharmacy compounding errors may also be a cause.
- Amiodarone, an antiarrhythmic drug, is structurally similar to thyroxine and may cause either under- or overactivity of the thyroid.
- Postpartum thyroiditis (PPT) occurs in about 7% of women during the year after they give birth. PPT typically has several phases, the first of which is hyperthyroidism. This form of hyperthyroidism usually corrects itself within weeks or months without the need for treatment.
- A struma ovarii is a rare form of monodermal teratoma that contains mostly thyroid tissue, which leads to hyperthyroidism.
- Excess iodine consumption, notably from algae such as kelp.

Thyrotoxicosis can also occur after taking too much thyroid hormone in the form of supplements, such as levothyroxine (a phenomenon known as exogenous thyrotoxicosis, alimentary thyrotoxicosis, or occult factitial thyrotoxicosis).

Hypersecretion of thyroid-stimulating hormone (TSH), which in turn is almost always caused by a pituitary adenoma, accounts for much less than 1 percent of hyperthyroidism cases.

== Diagnosis ==
Measuring the level of thyroid-stimulating hormone (TSH), produced by the pituitary gland (which in turn is also regulated by the hypothalamus's TSH-Releasing Hormone) in the blood, is typically the initial test for suspected hyperthyroidism. A low TSH level typically indicates that the pituitary gland is being inhibited or "instructed" by the brain to cut back on stimulating the thyroid gland, having sensed increased levels of T_{4} and/or T_{3} in the blood. In rare circumstances, a low TSH indicates primary failure of the pituitary, or temporary inhibition of the pituitary due to another illness (euthyroid sick syndrome), and so checking the T_{4} and T_{3} is still clinically useful.

Measuring specific antibodies, such as anti-TSH-receptor antibodies in Graves' disease, or anti-thyroid peroxidase in Hashimoto's thyroiditis—a common cause of hypothyroidism—may also contribute to the diagnosis. The diagnosis of hyperthyroidism is confirmed by blood tests that show a decreased thyroid-stimulating hormone (TSH) level and elevated T_{4} and T_{3} levels. TSH is a hormone made by the pituitary gland in the brain that tells the thyroid gland how much hormone to make. When there is too much thyroid hormone, the TSH will be low. A radioactive iodine uptake test and thyroid scan together characterize or enable radiologists and doctors to determine the cause of hyperthyroidism. The uptake test uses radioactive iodine injected or taken orally on an empty stomach to measure the amount of iodine absorbed by the thyroid gland. People with hyperthyroidism absorb much more iodine than healthy people, including radioactive iodine, which is easy to measure. A thyroid scan producing images is typically conducted in connection with the uptake test to allow visual examination of the over-functioning gland.

Thyroid scintigraphy is a useful test to characterize (distinguish between causes of) hyperthyroidism, and this entity from thyroiditis. This test procedure typically involves two tests performed in connection with each other: an iodine uptake test and a scan (imaging) with a gamma camera. The uptake test involves administering a dose of radioactive iodine (radioiodine), traditionally iodine-131 (^{131}I), and more recently iodine-123 (^{123}I). Iodine-123 may be the preferred radionuclide in some clinics due to its more favorable radiation dosimetry (i.e., less radiation dose to the person per unit administered radioactivity) and a gamma photon energy more amenable to imaging with the gamma camera. For the imaging scan, I-123 is considered an almost ideal isotope of iodine for imaging thyroid tissue and thyroid cancer metastasis. Thyroid scintigraphy should not be performed in those who are pregnant, a thyroid ultrasound with color flow doppler may be obtained as an alternative in these circumstances.

Typical administration involves a pill or liquid containing sodium iodide (NaI) taken orally, which contains a small amount of iodine-131, amounting to perhaps less than a grain of salt. A 2-hour fast of no food before and for 1 hour after ingesting the pill is required. This low dose of radioiodine is typically tolerated by individuals otherwise allergic to iodine (such as those unable to tolerate contrast mediums containing larger doses of iodine, such as used in CT scan, intravenous pyelogram (IVP), and similar imaging diagnostic procedures). Excess radioiodine that does not get absorbed into the thyroid gland is eliminated by the body in urine. Some people with hyperthyroidism may experience a slight allergic reaction to the diagnostic radioiodine and may be given an antihistamine.

The person returns 24 hours later to have the level of radioiodine "uptake" (absorbed by the thyroid gland) measured by a device with a metal bar placed against the neck, which measures the radioactivity emitted from the thyroid. This test takes about 4 minutes while the uptake % (i.e., percentage) is accumulated (calculated) by the machine software. A scan is also performed, wherein images (typically a center, left, and right angle) are taken of the contrasted thyroid gland with a gamma camera; a radiologist will read and prepare a report indicating the uptake % and comments after examining the images. People with hyperthyroidism will typically "take up" higher-than-normal levels of radioiodine. Normal ranges for RAI uptake are from 10 to 30%.

In addition to testing the TSH levels, many doctors test for T_{3}, Free T_{3}, T_{4}, and/or Free T_{4} for more detailed results. Free T_{4} is unbound to any protein in the blood. Adult limits for these hormones are: TSH (units): 0.45 – 4.50 uIU/mL; T_{4} Free/Direct (nanograms): 0.82 – 1.77 ng/dl; and T_{3} (nanograms): 71 – 180 ng/dl. Persons with hyperthyroidism can easily exhibit levels many times these upper limits for T_{4} and/or T_{3}. See a complete table of normal range limits for thyroid function at the thyroid gland article.

In hyperthyroidism, CK-MB (Creatine kinase) is usually elevated.

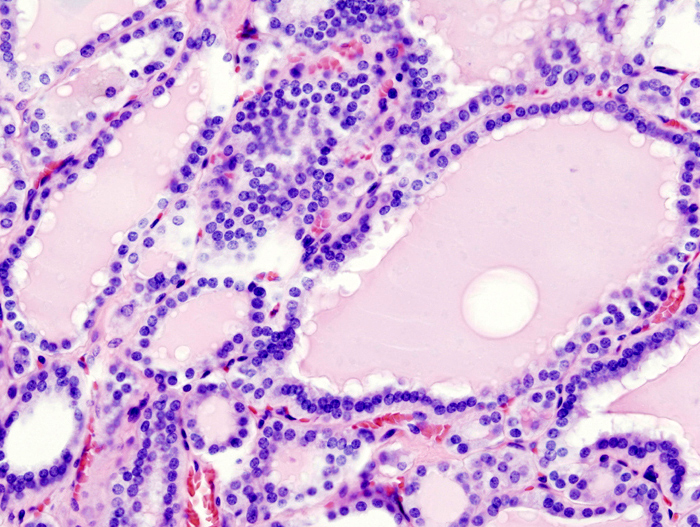

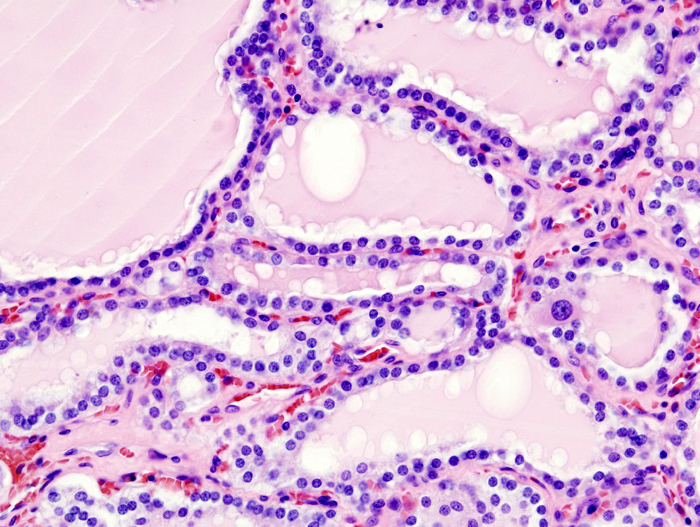

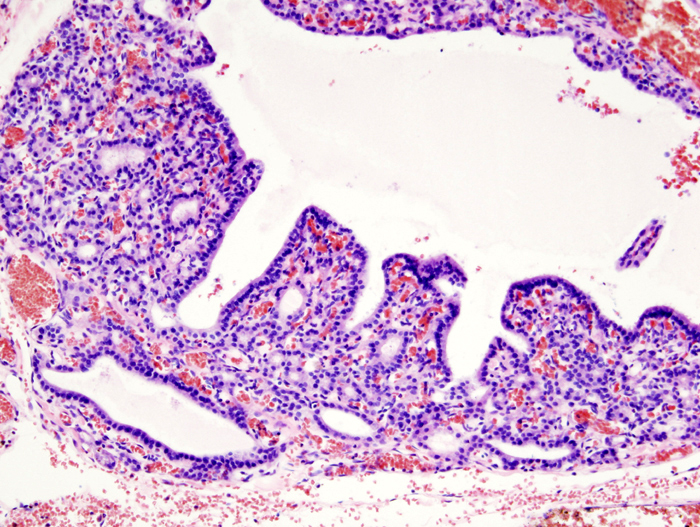

=== Subclinical ===
In overt primary hyperthyroidism, TSH levels are low, and T_{4} and T_{3} levels are high. Subclinical hyperthyroidism is a milder form of hyperthyroidism characterized by low or undetectable serum TSH level, but with a normal serum free thyroxine level. Although the evidence for doing so is not definitive, treatment of elderly persons having subclinical hyperthyroidism could reduce the number of cases of atrial fibrillation. There is also an increased risk of bone fractures (by 42%) in people with subclinical hyperthyroidism; there is insufficient evidence to say whether treatment with antithyroid medications would reduce that risk.

A 2022 meta-analysis found subclinical hyperthyroidism to be associated with cardiovascular death.

=== Screening ===
In those without symptoms who are not pregnant, there is little evidence for or against screening.

== Treatment ==
=== Antithyroid drugs ===
Thyrostatics (antithyroid drugs) are drugs that inhibit the production of thyroid hormones, such as carbimazole (used in the UK) and methimazole (used in the US, Germany, and Russia), and propylthiouracil. Thyrostatics are believed to work by inhibiting the iodination of thyroglobulin by thyroperoxidase and, thus, the formation of tetraiodothyronine (T_{4}). Propylthiouracil also works outside the thyroid gland, preventing the conversion of (mostly inactive) T_{4} to the active form T_{3}. Because thyroid tissue usually contains a substantial reserve of thyroid hormone, thyrostatics can take weeks to become effective, and the dose often needs to be carefully titrated over a period of months, with regular doctor visits and blood tests to monitor results.

=== Beta-blockers ===
Many of the common symptoms of hyperthyroidism, such as palpitations, trembling, and anxiety, are mediated by increases in beta-adrenergic receptors on cell surfaces. Beta blockers, typically used to treat high blood pressure, are a class of drugs that offset this effect, reducing the rapid pulse associated with palpitations, and decreasing tremor and anxiety. Thus, a person with hyperthyroidism can often obtain immediate temporary relief until the hyperthyroidism can be characterized with the Radioiodine test noted above, and more permanent treatment takes place. Note that these drugs do not treat hyperthyroidism or any of its long-term effects if left untreated, but rather, they treat or reduce only symptoms of the condition.

Some minimal effect on thyroid hormone production also comes with propranolol, which has two roles in the treatment of hyperthyroidism, determined by the different isomers of propranolol. L-propranolol causes beta-blockade, thus treating the symptoms associated with hyperthyroidism, such as tremor, palpitations, anxiety, and heat intolerance. D-propranolol inhibits thyroxine deiodinase, thereby blocking the conversion of T_{4} to T_{3}, providing some, though minimal, therapeutic effect. Other beta-blockers are used to treat only the symptoms associated with hyperthyroidism. Propranolol in the UK, and metoprolol in the US, are most frequently used to augment treatment for people with hyperthyroidism.

=== Diet ===
People with autoimmune hyperthyroidism (such as in Graves' disease) should not eat foods high in iodine, such as edible seaweed and seafood. Many processed foods also contain high levels of iodine.

From a public health perspective, the general introduction of iodized salt in the United States in 1924 resulted in lower rates of disease and goiters, and improved the lives of children whose mothers would not have eaten enough iodine during pregnancy, which would have lowered the IQs of their children.

=== Surgery ===
Surgery (thyroidectomy to remove the whole thyroid or a part of it) is not extensively used because most common forms of hyperthyroidism are quite effectively treated by the radioactive iodine method, and because there is a risk of also removing the parathyroid glands, and of cutting the recurrent laryngeal nerve, making swallowing difficult, and even simply generalized staphylococcal infection as with any major surgery. Some people with Graves' may opt for surgical intervention. This includes those who cannot tolerate medicines for one reason or another, people who are allergic to iodine, or people who refuse radioiodine.

A 2019 systematic review concluded that the available evidence shows no difference between visually identifying the nerve or utilizing intraoperative neuroimaging during surgery, when trying to prevent injury to the recurrent laryngeal nerve during thyroid surgery.

If people have toxic nodules, treatments typically include either the removal or injection of the nodule with alcohol.

=== Radioiodine ===
In iodine-131 (radioiodine) radioisotope therapy, which was first pioneered by Dr. Saul Hertz, radioactive iodine-131 is given orally (either by pill or liquid) on a one-time basis, to severely restrict, or altogether destroy the function of a hyperactive thyroid gland. This isotope of radioactive iodine used for ablative treatment is more potent than diagnostic radioiodine (usually iodine-123 or a very low amount of iodine-131), which has a biological half-life of 8–13 hours. Iodine-131, which also emits beta particles that are far more damaging to tissues at short range, has a half-life of approximately 8 days. People not responding sufficiently to the first dose are sometimes given an additional radioiodine treatment at a larger dose. Iodine-131 in this treatment is picked up by the active cells in the thyroid and destroys them, rendering the thyroid gland mostly or completely inactive.

Since iodine is picked up more readily (though not exclusively) by thyroid cells, and (more importantly) is picked up even more readily by overactive thyroid cells, the destruction is local, and there are no widespread side effects with this therapy. Radioiodine ablation has been used for over 50 years, and the only major reasons for not using it are pregnancy and breastfeeding (breast tissue also picks up and concentrates iodine). Once the thyroid function is reduced, replacement hormone therapy (levothyroxine) taken each day orally replaces the thyroid hormone that is normally produced by the body.

There is extensive experience, over many years, of the use of radioiodine in the treatment of thyroid overactivity, and this experience does not indicate any increased risk of thyroid cancer following treatment. However, a study from 2007 has reported an increased number of cancer cases after radioiodine treatment for hyperthyroidism.

The principal advantage of radioiodine treatment for hyperthyroidism is that it tends to have a much higher success rate than medications. Depending on the dose of radioiodine chosen, and the disease under treatment (Graves' vs. toxic goiter, vs. hot nodule, etc.), the success rate in achieving definitive resolution of the hyperthyroidism may vary from 75 to 100%. A major expected side-effect of radioiodine in people with Graves' disease is the development of lifelong hypothyroidism, requiring daily treatment with thyroid hormone. On occasion, some people may require more than one radioactive treatment, depending on the type of disease present, the size of the thyroid, and the initial dose administered.

People with Graves' disease manifesting moderate or severe Graves' ophthalmopathy are cautioned against radioactive iodine-131 treatment, since it has been shown to exacerbate existing thyroid eye disease. People with mild or no ophthalmic symptoms can mitigate their risk with a concurrent six-week course of prednisone. The mechanisms proposed for this side effect involve a TSH receptor common to both thyrocytes and retro-orbital tissue.

As radioactive iodine treatment results in the destruction of thyroid tissue, there is often a transient period of several days to weeks when the symptoms of hyperthyroidism may worsen following radioactive iodine therapy. In general, this happens as a result of thyroid hormones being released into the blood following the radioactive iodine-mediated destruction of thyroid cells that contain thyroid hormone. In some people, treatment with medications such as beta blockers (propranolol, atenolol, etc.) may be useful during this period. Most people do not experience any difficulty after the radioactive iodine treatment, usually given as a small pill. On occasion, neck tenderness or a sore throat may become apparent after a few days, if moderate inflammation in the thyroid develops and produces discomfort in the neck or throat area. This is usually transient, and not associated with a fever, etc.

It is recommended that breastfeeding be stopped at least six weeks before radioactive iodine treatment and that it not be resumed, although it can be done in future pregnancies. It also shouldn't be done during pregnancy, and pregnancy should be put off until at least 6–12 months after treatment.

A common outcome following radioiodine is a swing from hyperthyroidism to easily treatable hypothyroidism, which occurs in 78% of those treated for Graves' thyrotoxicosis and in 40% of those with toxic multinodular goiter or solitary toxic adenoma. Use of higher doses of radioiodine reduces the number of cases of treatment failure, with a penalty for higher response to treatment consisting mostly of higher rates of eventual hypothyroidism, which requires hormone treatment for life.

There is increased sensitivity to radioiodine therapy in thyroids appearing on ultrasound scans as more uniform (hypoechogenic), due to densely packed large cells, with 81% later becoming hypothyroid, compared to just 37% in those with more normal scan appearances (normoechogenic).

=== Thyroid storm ===
Thyroid storm presents with extreme symptoms of hyperthyroidism. It is treated aggressively with resuscitation measures along with a combination of the above modalities including: intravenous beta blockers such as propranolol, followed by a thioamide such as methimazole, an iodinated radiocontrast agent or an iodine solution if the radiocontrast agent is not available, and an intravenous steroid such as hydrocortisone. Propylthiouracil is the preferred thioamide in thyroid storm as it can prevent the conversion of T4 to the more active T3 in the peripheral tissues in addition to inhibiting thyroid hormone production.

=== Alternative medicine ===
In countries such as China, herbs used alone or with antithyroid medications are used to treat hyperthyroidism. Very low quality evidence suggests that traditional Chinese herbal medications may be beneficial when taken along with routine hyperthyroidism medications; however, there is no reliable evidence to determine the effectiveness of Chinese herbal medications for treating hyperthyroidism.

== Epidemiology ==
In the United States, hyperthyroidism affects about 1.2% of the population. About half of these cases have obvious symptoms, while the other half do not. It occurs between two and ten times more often in women. The disease is more common in those over the age of 60 years.

Subclinical hyperthyroidism modestly increases the risk of cognitive impairment and dementia.

== History ==
Caleb Hillier Parry first made the association between the goiter and eye protrusion in 1786; however, he did not publish his findings until 1825. In 1835, Irish doctor Robert James Graves discovered a link between the protrusion of the eyes and goiter, giving his name to the autoimmune disease now known as Graves' Disease.

== Pregnancy ==
Recognizing and evaluating hyperthyroidism in pregnancy is a diagnostic challenge. Thyroid hormones are commonly elevated during the first trimester of pregnancy as the pregnancy hormone human chorionic gonadotropin (hCG) stimulates thyroid hormone production, in a condition known as gestational transient thyrotoxicosis. Gestational transient thyrotoxicosis generally abates in the second trimester as hCG levels decline and thyroid function normalizes. Hyperthyroidism can increase the risk of complications for mother and child. Such risks include pregnancy-related hypertension, pregnancy loss, low-birth weight, pre-eclampsia, preterm delivery, still birth and behavioral disorders later in the child's life. Nonetheless, high maternal FT4 levels during pregnancy have been associated with impaired brain developmental outcomes of the offspring and this was independent of hCG levels.

Propylthiouracil is the preferred antithyroid medication in the 1st trimester of pregnancy as it is less teratogenic than methimazole.

== Other animals ==
=== Cats ===
Hyperthyroidism is one of the most common endocrine conditions affecting older domesticated housecats. In the United States, up to 10% of cats over ten years old have hyperthyroidism. The disease has become significantly more common since the first reports of feline hyperthyroidism in the 1970s. The most common cause of hyperthyroidism in cats is the presence of benign tumors called adenomas. Adenomas cause 98% of cases, but the reason these cats develop such tumors remains under study.

The most common presenting symptoms are: rapid weight loss, tachycardia (rapid heart rate), vomiting, diarrhea, increased consumption of fluids (polydipsia), increased appetite (polyphagia), and increased urine production (polyuria). Other symptoms include hyperactivity, possible aggression, an unkempt appearance, and large, thick claws. Heart murmurs and a gallop rhythm can develop due to secondary hypertrophic cardiomyopathy. About 70% of affected cats also have enlarged thyroid glands (goiter).

The same three treatments used with humans are also options in treating feline hyperthyroidism (surgery, radioiodine treatment, and anti-thyroid drugs). There is also a special low-iodine diet available that will control symptoms, provided no other food is fed; Hill's y/d formula, when given exclusively, decreases T4 production by limiting the amount of iodine needed for thyroid hormone production. It is the only available commercial diet that focuses on managing feline hyperthyroidism. Medical and dietary management using methimazole and Hill's y/d cat food will give hyperthyroid cats an average of 2 years before dying due to secondary conditions such as heart and kidney failure. Drugs used to help manage the symptoms of hyperthyroidism are methimazole and carbimazole. Drug therapy is the least expensive option, even though the drug must be administered daily for the remainder of the cat's life. Carbimazole is only available as a once-daily tablet. Methimazole is available as an oral solution, a tablet, and compounded as a topical gel that is applied using a finger cot to the hairless skin inside a cat's ear. Many cat owners find this gel a good option for cats that do not like being given pills.

Radioiodine treatment, however, is not available in all areas, as this treatment requires nuclear radiological expertise and facilities that not only board the cat, but are specially equipped to manage the cat's urine, sweat, saliva, and stool, which are radioactive for several days after the treatment, usually for a total of 3 weeks (the cat spends the first week in total isolation and the next two weeks in close confinement). In the United States, the guidelines for radiation levels vary from state to state; some states such as Massachusetts allow hospitalization for as little as two days before the animal is sent home with care instructions.

=== Dogs ===
Hyperthyroidism is much less common in dogs compared to cats. Hyperthyroidism may be caused by a thyroid tumor. This may be a thyroid carcinoma. About 90% of carcinomas are very aggressive; they invade the surrounding tissues and metastasize (spread) to other tissues, particularly the lungs. This has a poor prognosis. Surgery to remove the tumor is often very difficult due to metastasis into arteries, the esophagus, or the windpipe. It may be possible to reduce the size of the tumor, thus relieving symptoms and allowing time for other treatments to work. About 10% of thyroid tumors are benign; these often cause few symptoms.

In dogs treated for hypothyroidism (lack of thyroid hormone), iatrogenic hyperthyroidism may occur as a result of an overdose of the thyroid hormone replacement medication, levothyroxine; in this case, treatment involves reducing the dose of levothyroxine. Dogs which display coprophagy, the consumption of feces, and also live in a household with a dog receiving levothyroxine treatment, may develop hyperthyroidism if they frequently eat the feces from the dog receiving levothyroxine treatment.

Hyperthyroidism may occur if a dog eats an excessive amount of thyroid gland tissue. This has occurred in dogs fed commercial dog food.

== See also ==
- High-output cardiac failure
- Jod-Basedow phenomenon
- Hashitoxicosis
