= Thyroid adenoma =

Benign tumor of the thyroid gland

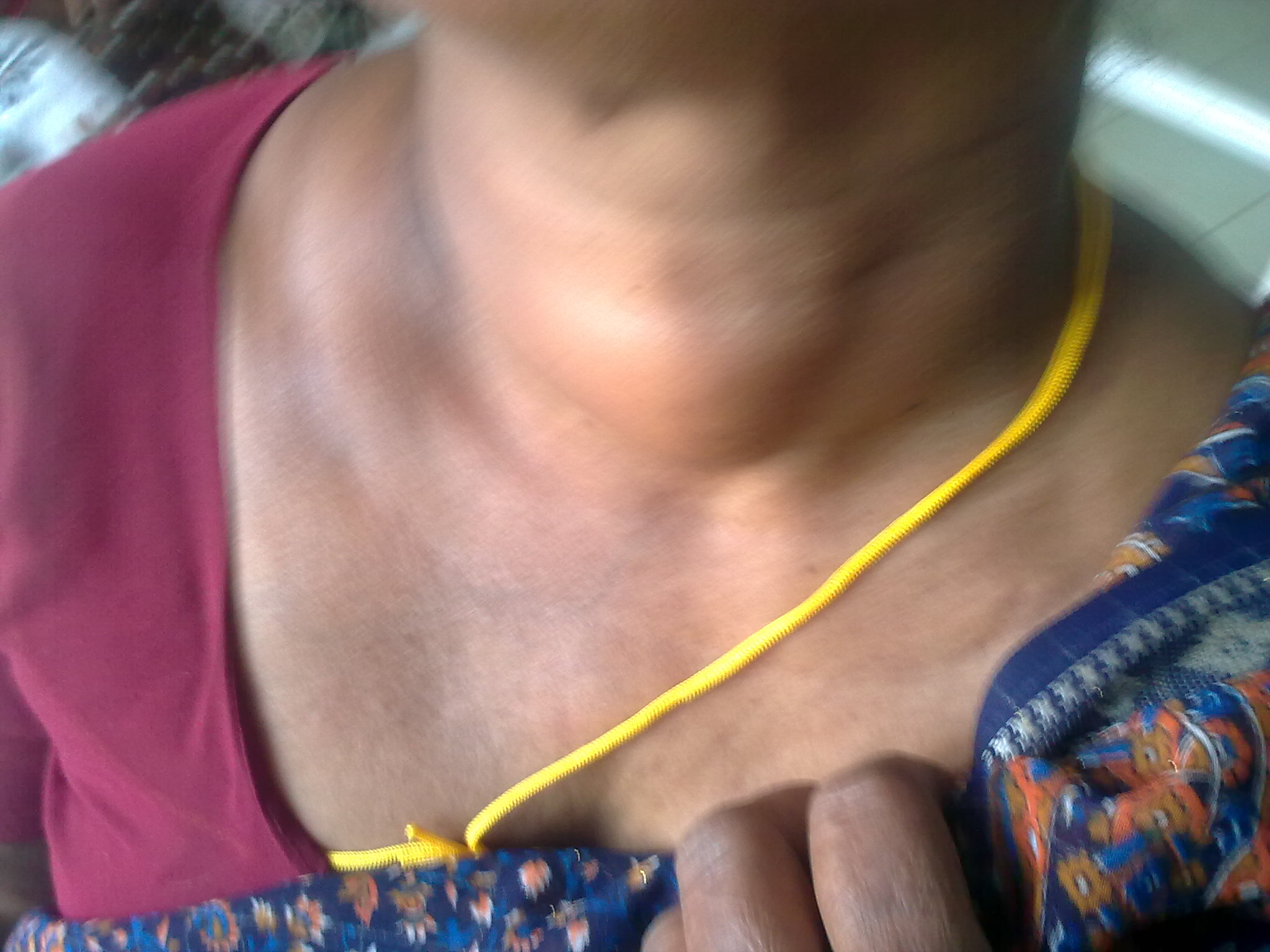
- Thyroid adenoma
- Specialty: Oncology, endocrinology

A thyroid adenoma is a benign tumor of the thyroid gland, that may be inactive or active (functioning autonomously) as a toxic adenoma.

== Signs and symptoms ==
A thyroid adenoma may be clinically silent ("cold" adenoma), or it may be a functional tumor, producing excessive thyroid hormone ("warm" or "hot" adenoma). In this case, it may result in symptomatic hyperthyroidism, and may be referred to as a toxic thyroid adenoma.

== Diagnosis ==
=== Morphology ===
Thyroid follicular adenoma ranges in diameter from 3 cm on an average, but sometimes is larger (up to 10 cm) or smaller. The typical thyroid adenoma is solitary, spherical and encapsulated lesion that is well demarcated from the surrounding parenchyma. The color ranges from gray-white to red-brown, depending upon

1. the cellularity of the adenoma
2. the colloid content.

Areas of hemorrhage, fibrosis, calcification, and cystic change, similar to what is found in multinodular goiters, are common in thyroid (follicular) adenoma, particularly in larger lesions.

=== Types ===
Almost all thyroid adenomata are follicular adenomata. Follicular adenomata can be described as "cold", "warm" or "hot" depending on their level of function. Histopathologically, follicular adenomata can be classified according to their cellular architecture and relative amounts of cellularity and colloid into the following types:

- Fetal (microfollicular) - these have the potential for microinvasion. These consist of small, closely packed follicles lined with epithelium.
- Colloid (macrofollicular) - these do not have any potential for microinvasion
- Embryonal (atypical) - have the potential for microinvasion.
- Hürthle cell adenoma (oxyphil or oncocytic tumor) - have the potential for microinvasion.
- Hyalinizing trabecular adenoma

Papillary adenomata are very rare.

=== Differential diagnosis ===
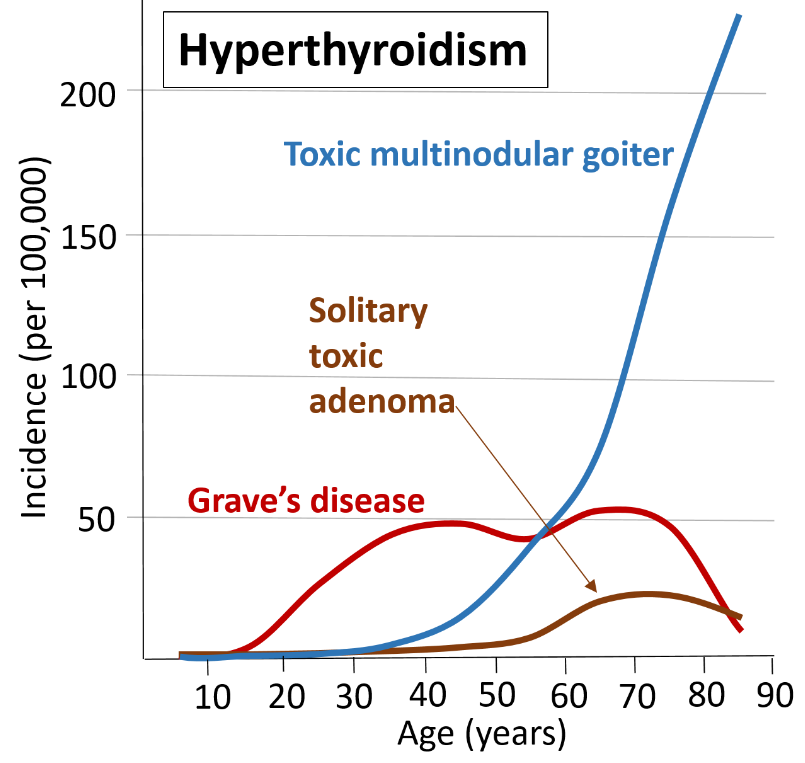
Most common causes of hyperthyroidism by age.

A thyroid adenoma is distinguished from a multinodular goiter of the thyroid in that an adenoma is typically solitary, and is a neoplasm resulting from a genetic mutation (or other genetic abnormality) in a single precursor cell. In contrast, a multinodular goiter is usually thought to result from a hyperplastic response of the entire thyroid gland to a stimulus, such as iodine deficiency.

Careful pathological examination may be necessary to distinguish a thyroid adenoma from a minimally invasive follicular thyroid carcinoma.

== Management ==
Most patients with thyroid adenoma can be managed by watchful waiting (without surgical excision) with regular monitoring. However, some patients still choose surgery after being fully informed of the risks. Regular monitoring mainly consists of watching for changes in nodule size and symptoms, and repeat ultrasonography or needle aspiration biopsy if the nodule grows. For patients with benign thyroid adenomata, thyroid lobectomy and isthmusectomy is a sufficient surgical treatment. This procedure is also adequate for patients with minimally invasive thyroid cancer. When histological examination shows no signs of malignancy, then no further intervention is required. These patients should continue to have their thyroid hormone status regularly checked.
