= Heat intolerance =

Symptom characterized by feeling overheated in warm environments

Heat intolerance is a symptom characterized by feeling overheated in warm environments or when the surrounding environment's temperature rises. Typically, the person feels uncomfortably hot and sweats excessively.

Compared to heat illnesses like heatstroke, heat intolerance is usually a symptom of endocrine disorders, drugs, or other medical conditions, rather than the result of too much exercise or hot, humid weather.

== Symptoms ==
- Feeling subjectively hot
- Sweating, which may be excessive

In patients with multiple sclerosis (MS), heat intolerance may cause a pseudoexacerbation, which is a temporary worsening of MS-related symptoms. A temporary worsening of symptoms can also happen in patients with postural orthostatic tachycardia syndrome (POTS) and dysautonomia.

== Diagnosis ==
Diagnosis is largely made from the patient history, followed by blood tests and other medical tests to determine the underlying cause. In women, hot flashes must be excluded.

== Causes ==
Excess thyroid hormone, which is called thyrotoxicosis (such as in cases of hyperthyroidism), is the most common cause.

Other causes include:

- Stimulants, such as amphetamines, caffeine, appetite suppressants, etc.
- Anticholinergics and other drugs that can impair sweating
- Malignant hyperthermia susceptibility
- Menopause
- Multiple sclerosis
- Fibromyalgia
- Diabetes
- Hypothalamic tumors
- Methadone treatment
- Dysautonomia
- Postural orthostatic tachycardia syndrome (POTS)
- Sensory defensiveness/sensory processing disorder
- Serotonin syndrome

== Treatment ==
Treatment is directed at making the affected person feel more comfortable, and, if possible, resolving the underlying cause of the heat intolerance.

Symptoms can be reduced by staying in a cool environment. Drinking more fluids, especially if the person is sweating excessively, may help.

Cooling vests can be used as a preventative tool to reduce a person's body temperature or when symptoms present to feel more comfortable.
