= List of instruments used in endocrinology =

Endocrinology is a branch of internal medicine dealing with hormones, the chemical messengers released internally to regulate the body's physiologic functions. Endocrinologists diagnose and manage diseases of endocrine glands, including hypothalamus, pituitary, thyroid, parathyroid, pancreatic islets, adrenals, testes, and ovaries. Some of the most common conditions treated are diabetes mellitus, diseases of the thyroid gland, metabolic bone disorders, pituitary disorders, and disorders of the reproductive system and infertility; in children, typical conditions are growth deficiency, delay of puberty, and a variety of genetic disorders. In endocrinology, diagnosis is heavily relied on laboratory tests, as it is important to find out diseases before they actually become clinically evident; still, medical history and physical examination remain indispensable. As a branch of internal medicine, practice of endocrinology makes use of common medical instruments, used by all or most clinical specialties, like the stethoscope or the sphygmomanometer. The following list does not include these, but only instruments that have relatively specific uses central to endocrinology (but not necessarily limited to it). They are either utilized by the physician (generally the endocrinologist themselves, or potentially by a different specialist, like a radiologist) for diagnosis or treatment; or prescribed for patient use.

== Instrument list ==
Instrument	Description	Uses	Image
General
Ultrasound system	A console, or a portable system, which includes a monitor and a transducer, and utilizes ultrasound to image body tissues.	To image the thyroid and parathyroid glands and neck lymph nodes; also, to guide diagnostic fine needle aspiration or therapeutic ethanol injection to these organs. To evaluate testes (scrotal ultrasound) and ovaries (pelvic ultrasound).	
Diabetes
Continuous glucose monitor	Consists of a sensor electrode (implanted or disposable) that measures glucose concentration in the interstitial fluid, and a receiver device where the measurements are sent through by a transmitter to be displayed.	To automatically measure glucose at regular intervals (e.g. every 5–15 minutes). Measurements can be displayed to the patient continuously, or after scanning the device. An alarm may sound to notify of measured or predicted hyper- or hypoglycemia.	
Glucose meter	A portable electronic device that takes single-use strips, where a drop of blood is placed. Allows self-monitoring by the patient.	To measure blood glucose	
Insulin pen	A portable drug-delivery device, comprising an insulin container (prefilled for disposable pens, or refillable with cartridges); a dialing system to select the dose (in increments of 0.5 or 1 Unit); and a button which delivers the drug when pressed; disposable needles are attached prior to each use.	To administrate insulin under the skin. Smart insulin pens have been developed that wirelessly connect to mobile apps, to log doses and variously facilitate therapy.	
Insulin pump	A small, portable pump, which delivers insulin from a container, via a plastic tubule and a cannula, under the skin.	To continuously infuse fast-acting insulin that covers the basal insulin needs of the body, and also bolus doses as needed for meals or high glucose values. Pumps can be augmented with continuous glucose monitors, to better control insulin administration.	
Lancing device	A portable instrument that takes single-use needles or lancets. It contains a spring, which is cocked and released by buttons. Once loaded, the device is held against a fingertip, and upon release the spring drives the lancet to prick the skin rapidly, and thereby less painfully. It also includes a controlling system to alter the penetration depth.	To produce a drop of capillary blood for blood sugar testing.	
Thyroid gland disorders
Hertel exophthalmometer	A system of mirrors or prisms that projects a lateral view of the eye against a ruler that measures the distance from the lateral canthus to the anterior surface of the cornea	To evaluate the prominence of the eye, which increases in hyperthyroidism	
Luedde exophthalmometer	A transparent ruler, held against the lateral rim of the orbit	To evaluate the prominence of the eye	
Disorders of male sex hormones
Nocturnal penile tumescence and rigidity device	A wearable device including loop transducers that are wrapped around the penis, which connects to a microcomputer.	To evaluate nocturnal erections end male sexual potency	
Prader orchidometer	A string of testicle-shaped beads of increasing size	To measure, by comparison, the size of testicles	
Seager orchidometer	A calliper	To measure the long axis of the testicle	

== See also ==
- List of surgical instruments
- Instruments used in internal medicine
