= Exophthalmos =

Bulging of the eye anteriorly out of the orbit

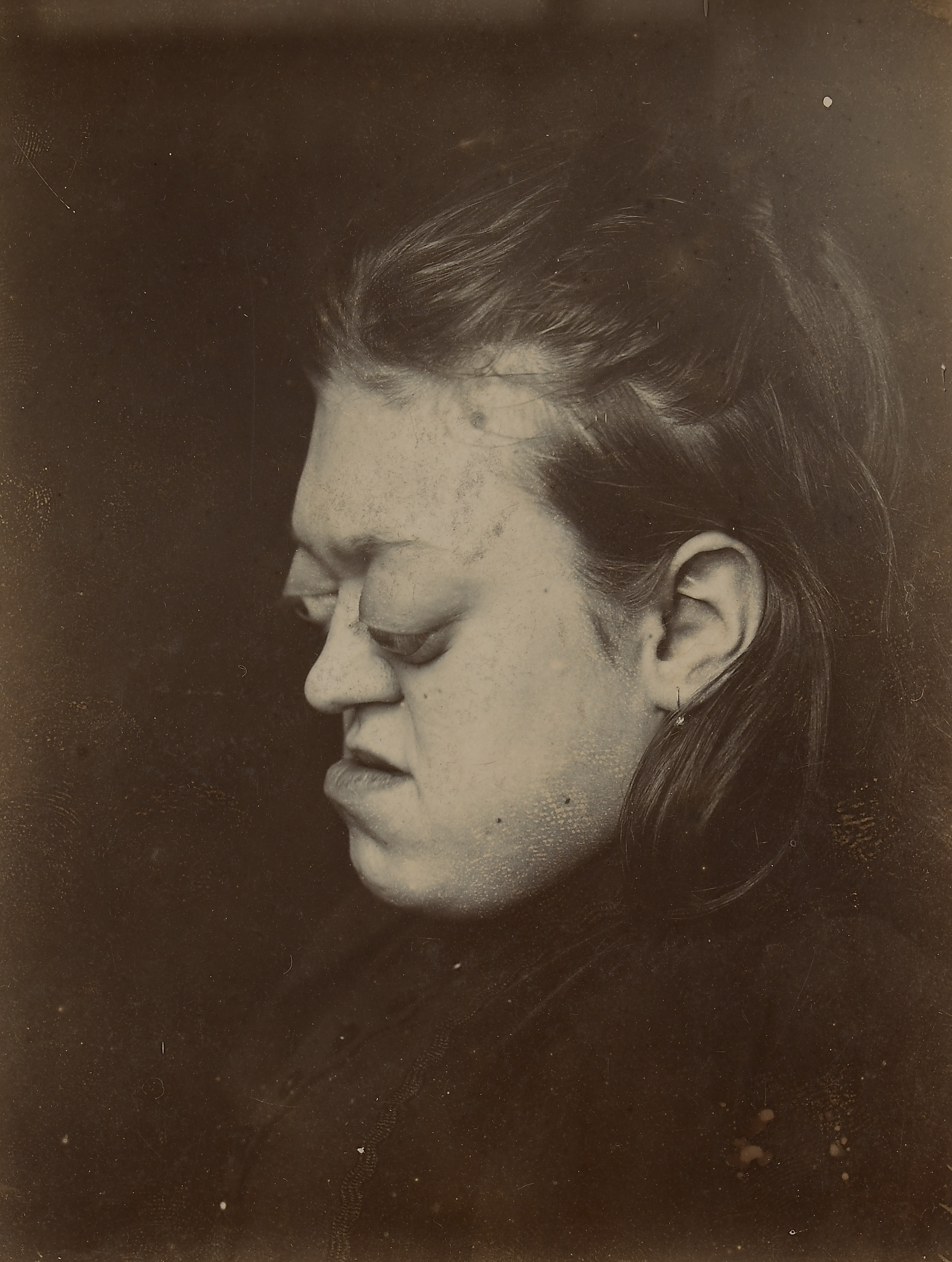
- Bilateral exophthalmos in a 17-year-old girl with facial symptoms of Pfeiffer syndrome
- Specialty: Ophthalmology

Exophthalmos (also called exophthalmus, exophthalmia, proptosis, or exorbitism) is a bulging of the eye anteriorly out of the orbit. Exophthalmos can be either bilateral (as is often seen in Graves' disease) or unilateral (as is often seen in an orbital tumor). Complete or partial dislocation from the orbit is also possible from trauma or swelling of surrounding tissue resulting from trauma.

Exophthalmos has endocrine causes. In the case of Graves' disease, the displacement of the eye results from abnormal connective tissue deposition in the orbit and extraocular muscles, which can be visualized by CT or MRI.

If left untreated, exophthalmos can cause the eyelids to fail to close during sleep, leading to corneal dryness and damage. Another possible complication is a form of redness or irritation called superior limbic keratoconjunctivitis, in which the area above the cornea becomes inflamed as a result of increased friction when blinking. The process that is causing the displacement of the eye may also compress the optic nerve or ophthalmic artery, and lead to blindness.

== Causes ==
Many patients with exophthalmos have a history of endocrine abnormalities, including thyroid related disease or "thyrotoxic activity". Other endocrine related causes of exophthalmos include infection and "IgG4-related disease". The most common cause of exophthalmos in adults is eye disease associated with a dysfunctioning thyroid gland. Exophthalmos in children is possible and most likely caused by tumors or cancers like leukemia. In rare cases, exophthalmos can occur in patients with normal thyroid function or underactive thyroid function.

The thyroid gland is stimulated by thyroid-stimulating hormone (TSH). The majority of patients with Grave's disease have antibodies called thyroid-stimulating antibodies, which are immune to the thyroid stimulating hormone. The thyroid stimulating hormone has some receptors in the fat cells around the eyeballs. The immune system attacks the fatty tissues, as well as other tissues around the eyes, causing them to stick out from the sockets. There is something called exophthalmos-producing substance, which competes with thyroid stimulating hormone receptors. The affinity of the exophthalmos-producing substance is strengthened if there is also "ophthalmologic immunoglobulins".

Exophthalmos can also happen from something that pushes the eye toward the front of the socket. Some examples include blood clots, tumors, infection, or trauma..

According to the NCBI, the following conditions feature exophthalmos:

- 4p partial monosomy syndrome

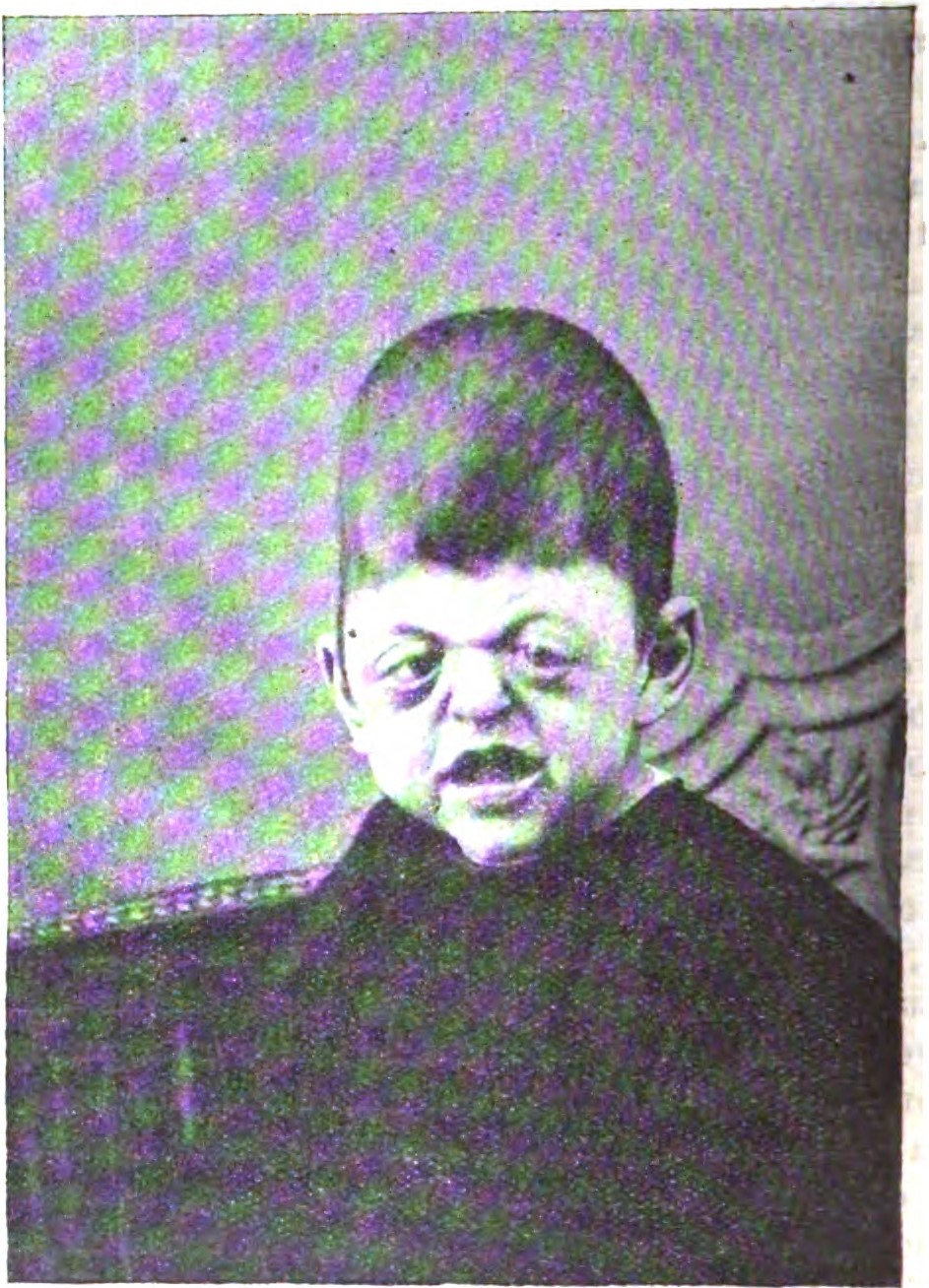
Exophthalmos in Acrocephalosyndactyly type 1

- Acrocephalosyndactyly type I
- Acrofrontofacionasal dysostosis type 2
- Aneurysm-osteoarthritis syndrome
- Antley-Bixler syndrome
- Atelosteogenesis type I
- Autism spectrum disorder due to AUTS2 deficiency
- Autosomal dominant intellectual disability-craniofacial anomalies-cardiac defects syndrome
- Autosomal dominant Robinow syndrome 1–3
- Autosomal recessive congenital ichthyosis 4B
- Autosomal recessive osteopetrosis 5, 7
- Autosomal recessive Robinow syndrome
- Axenfeld-Rieger anomaly with partially absent eye muscles, distinctive face, hydrocephaly, and skeletal abnormalities
- Axenfeld-Rieger syndrome type 3
- Beare-Stevenson cutis gyrata syndrome
- Beckwith-Wiedemann syndrome
- Bohring-Opitz syndrome
- Cardio-facio-cutaneous syndrome
- Catel-Manzke syndrome
- Childhood hypophosphatasia
- Chondrodysplasia with joint dislocations, gPAPP type

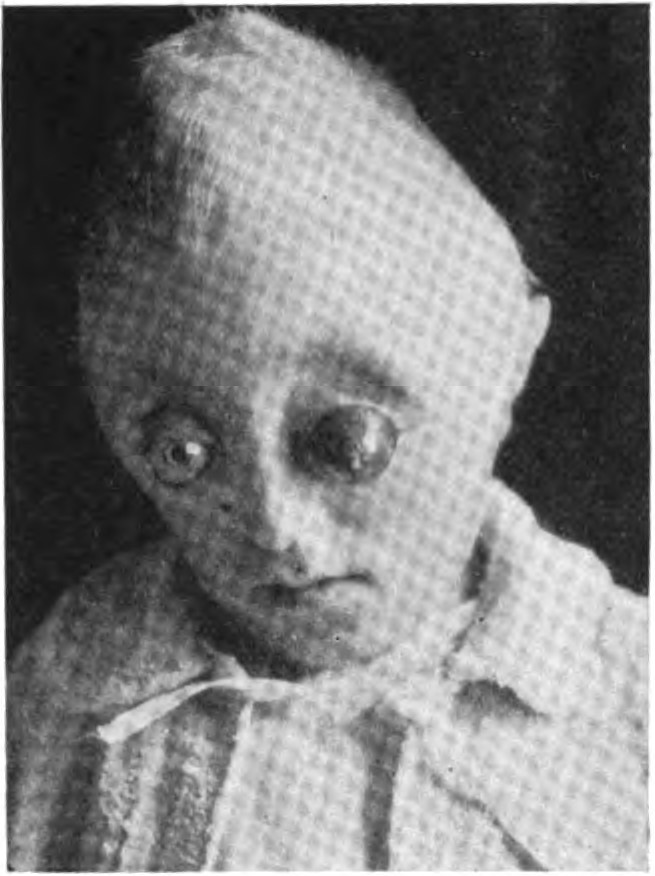
Exophthalmos in cloverleaf skull

- Cloverleaf skull syndrome
- COG1 congenital disorder of glycosylation
- Cole-Carpenter syndrome 1, 2
- Congenital myopathy 22A, classic
- Congenital myopathy 22B, severe fetal
- Cornelia de Lange syndrome 1
- Craniosynostosis 4
- Craniosynostosis and dental anomalies

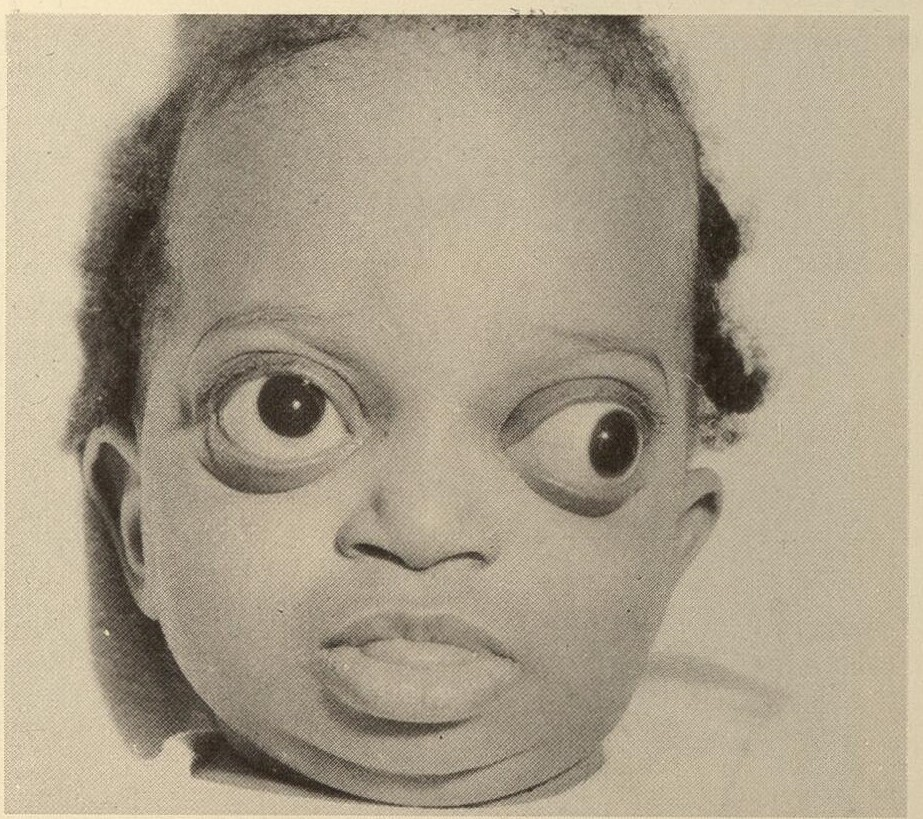
Exophthalmos in Crouzon syndrome

- Crouzon syndrome
- Crouzon syndrome-acanthosis nigricans syndrome
- Cutis laxa, autosomal recessive, types 1B and 2E
- Developmental and epileptic encephalopathy, 48, 75, and 80
- Donnai-Barrow syndrome
- Ehlers-Danlos syndrome, spondylodysplastic type, 1 and 2
- Familial hyperthyroidism due to mutations in TSH receptor
- Fibrochondrogenesis 1
- Fibrous dysplasia of jaw
- Filippi syndrome
- Fontaine progeroid syndrome
- Frank-Ter Haar syndrome
- Graves disease, susceptibility to, 1
- H syndrome
- Holoprosencephaly 2, 3, and 11
- Intellectual disability, X-linked, syndromic 33
- Jackson-Weiss syndrome
- Keppen-Lubinsky syndrome
- Kniest dysplasia
- Larsen-like syndrome, B3GAT3 type
- Leprechaunism syndrome
- Liver disease, severe congenital
- Loeys-Dietz syndrome 1, 2
- Mandibuloacral dysplasia progeroid syndrome
- Mandibuloacral dysplasia with type A lipodystrophy
- Mandibuloacral dysplasia with type B lipodystrophy
- Marbach-Rustad progeroid syndrome
- Marshall-Smith syndrome
- Melnick-Needles syndrome
- Microcephalic osteodysplastic primordial dwarfism, type 3

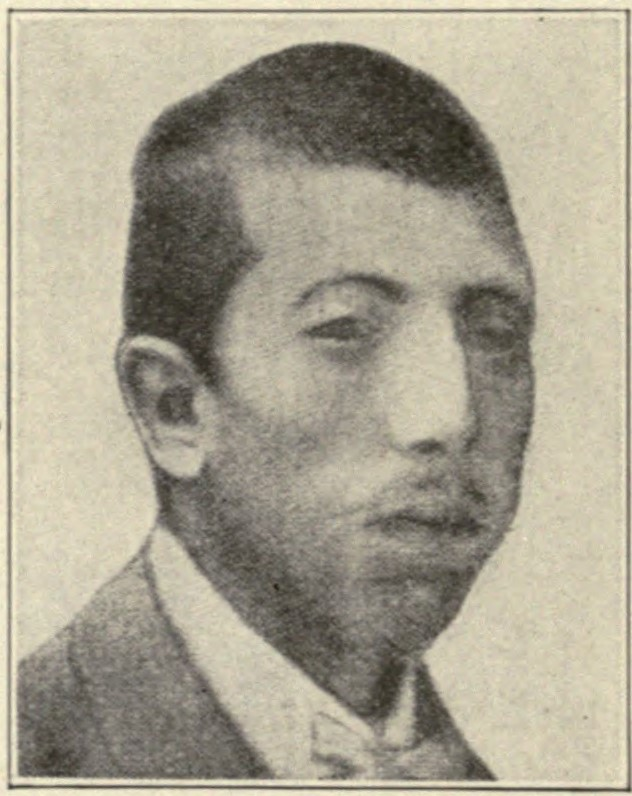
Exophthalmos in microcephaly (with turricephaly)

- Microcephaly 3, primary, autosomal recessive
- Microcephaly 5, primary, autosomal recessive
- Muenke syndrome
- NDE1-related microhydranencephaly
- Neonatal pseudo-hydrocephalic progeroid syndrome
- Nestor-Guillermo progeria syndrome
- Neu-Laxova syndrome 1, 2
- Ogden syndrome
- Osteogenesis imperfecta types 7, 8
- Pallister-Killian syndrome
- Periventricular nodular heterotopia 7
- Pontocerebellar hypoplasia types 3, 10
- Progeroid and marfanoid aspect-lipodystrophy syndrome
- Prolidase deficiency
- Restrictive dermopathy 2
- Rienhoff syndrome
- Ritscher-Schinzel syndrome 4
- Roberts-SC phocomelia syndrome
- Robinow syndrome, autosomal recessive 2
- Rubinstein-Taybi syndrome due to CREBBP mutations
- Sclerosteosis 1
- Shprintzen-Goldberg syndrome
- Spondyloepimetaphyseal dysplasia with joint laxity, type 1, with or without fractures
- Spondyloepimetaphyseal dysplasia-short limb-abnormal calcification syndrome
- Spondylometaphyseal dysplasia with corneal dystrophy
- Tetralogy of Fallot
- Thyroid hormone resistance, generalized, autosomal recessive
- Yunis-Varon syndrome

== Anatomy ==
Proptosis is the anterior displacement of the eye from the orbit. Since the orbit is closed off posteriorly, medially and laterally, any enlargement of structures located within will cause the anterior displacement of the eye. Swelling or enlargement of the lacrimal gland causes inferior medial and anterior dislocation of the eye. This is because the lacrimal glands are located superiorly and laterally in the orbit.

== Diagnosis and treatment ==
=== Measurement ===
Measurement of the degree of exophthalmos is performed using an exophthalmometer.

Most sources define exophthalmos/proptosis as a protrusion of the globe greater than 18 mm.

The term exophthalmos is often used when describing proptosis associated with Graves' disease.

=== Treatment ===
Exophthalmos is a progressive disease, so early detection and treatment is ideal. Diagnosing this condition may include imaging scans such as CT or MRI as well as blood tests to determine if the thyroid gland is functioning properly. Often, eye protrusion is measured to see how the disease progresses. Treatment for this disease includes radiation, surgery, and quitting smoking. Many times exophthalmos symptoms improve when hyperthyroidism is controlled, possibly using corticosteroid hormone replacement therapy.

== Animals ==
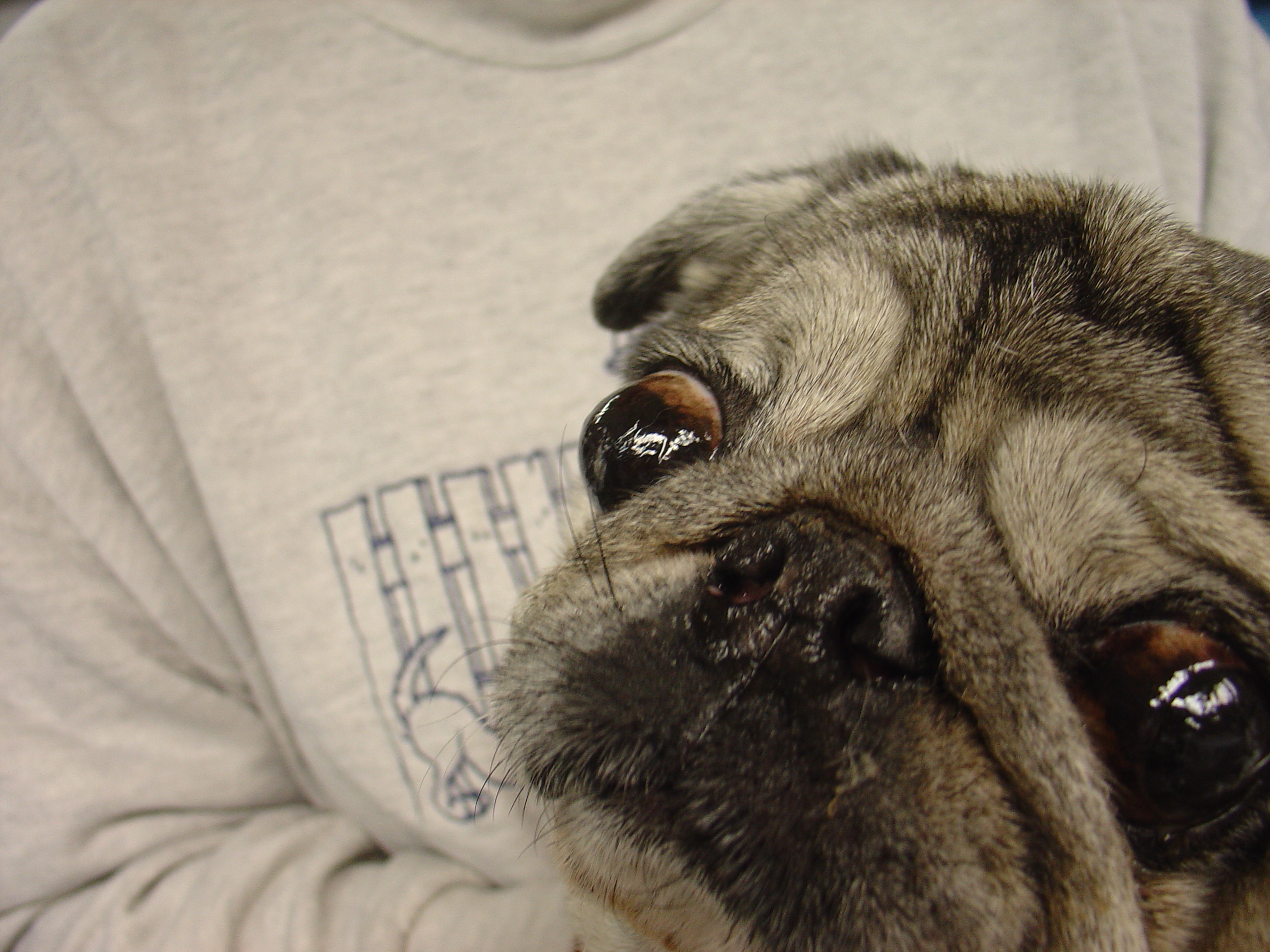
Exophthalmos in a Pug

Exophthalmos is commonly found in dogs. It is seen in brachycephalic (short-nosed) dog breeds because of the shallow orbit. It can lead to keratitis secondary to exposure of the cornea. Exophthalmos is commonly seen in the pug, Boston Terrier, Pekingese, and Shih Tzu. It is a common result of head trauma and pressure exerted on the front of the neck too hard in dogs. In cats, eye proptosis is uncommon and is often accompanied by facial fractures.

About 40% of proptosed eyes retain vision after being replaced in the orbit, but in cats very few retain vision. Replacement of the eye requires general anesthesia. The eyelids are pulled outward, and the eye is gently pushed back into place. The eyelids are sewn together in a procedure known as tarsorrhaphy for about five days to keep the eye in place. Replaced eyes have a higher rate of keratoconjunctivitis sicca and keratitis and often require lifelong treatment. If the damage is severe, the eye is removed in a relatively simple surgery known as enucleation of the eye.

The prognosis for a replaced eye is determined by the extent of damage to the cornea and sclera, the presence or absence of a pupillary light reflex, and the presence of ruptured rectus muscles. The rectus muscles normally help hold the eye in place and direct eye movement. Rupture of more than two rectus muscles usually requires the eye to be removed, because significant blood vessel and nerve damage also usually occurs. Compared to brachycephalic breeds, dochilocephalic (long-nosed) breeds usually have more trauma to the eye and its surrounding structures, so the prognosis is worse.

== See also ==
- Boston's sign
- Carotid-cavernous fistula
- Enophthalmos
- Von Graefe's sign
