= COG7 =

Protein-coding gene in the species Homo sapiens

Identifiers
- Aliases: COG7, CDG2E, component of oligomeric golgi complex 7
- External IDs: OMIM: 606978; MGI: 2685013; GeneCards: COG7

Gene location (Human)
Chr.	Chromosome 16 (human)
Band	16p12.2	Start	23,388,493 bp
Band	16p12.2	End	23,453,189 bp

Gene location (Mouse)
Chr.	Chromosome 7 (mouse)
Band	7|7 F2	Start	121,478,586 bp
Band	7|7 F2	End	121,580,934 bp
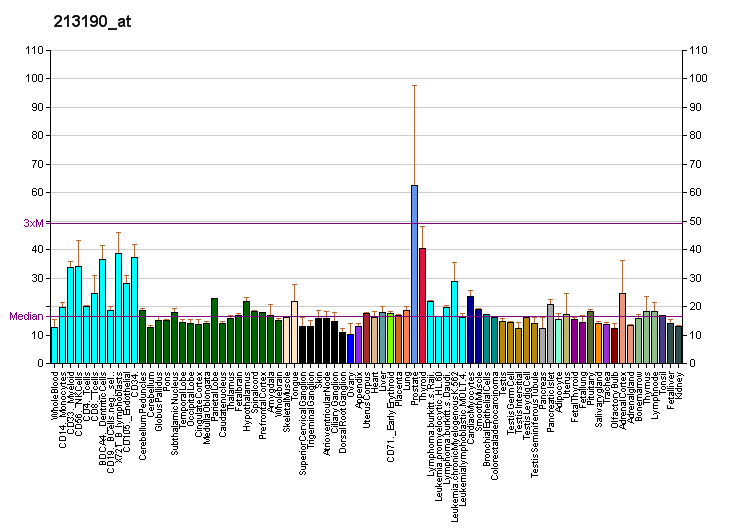
RNA expression pattern
Bgee	Human / Mouse (ortholog); Top expressed in: right uterine tube; anterior pituitary; canal of the cervix; right lobe of thyroid gland; left lobe of thyroid gland; apex of heart; mucosa of transverse colon; bronchial epithelial cell; olfactory zone of nasal mucosa; ectocervix / Top expressed in: otolith organ; utricle; Epithelium of choroid plexus; supraoptic nucleus; decidua; lobe of prostate; retinal pigment epithelium; arcuate nucleus; paraventricular nucleus of hypothalamus; median eminence; More reference expression data
BioGPS	More reference expression data
Gene ontology
Molecular function	protein binding
Cellular component	nucleolus; membrane; Golgi apparatus; Golgi transport complex; trans-Golgi network membrane; Golgi membrane
Biological process	protein localization to organelle; protein glycosylation; endoplasmic reticulum to Golgi vesicle-mediated transport; protein transport; protein stabilization; intracellular protein transport; retrograde vesicle-mediated transport, Golgi to endoplasmic reticulum; Golgi organization; protein localization to Golgi apparatus
Sources:Amigo / QuickGO
Orthologs
Databases	NCBI: entry; OMA: entry
Species	Human	Mouse
Entrez	91949	233824
Ensembl	ENSG00000168434	ENSMUSG00000034951
UniProt	P83436	Q3UM29
RefSeq (mRNA)	NM_153603	NM_001033318
RefSeq (protein)	NP_705831	NP_001028490
Location (UCSC)	Chr 16: 23.39 – 23.45 Mb	Chr 7: 121.48 – 121.58 Mb
PubMed search
- Wikidata
View/Edit Human	View/Edit Mouse

Conserved oligomeric Golgi complex subunit 7 is a protein that in humans is encoded by the COG7 gene.

Multiprotein complexes are key determinants of Golgi apparatus structure and its capacity for intracellular transport and glycoprotein modification. Several complexes have been identified, including the Golgi transport complex (GTC), the LDLC complex, which is involved in glycosylation reactions, and the SEC34 complex, which is involved in vesicular transport. These 3 complexes are identical and have been termed the conserved oligomeric Golgi (COG) complex, which includes COG7 (Ungar et al., 2002).[supplied by OMIM]

== Interactions ==
COG7 has been shown to interact with COG4 and COG5.
