= SMED =

SMED may stand for:

- Spondylo-meta-epiphyseal dysplasia, a rare autosomal-recessive disease
- Single-minute exchange of die, a lean production method
