= Lsy-6 microRNA =

lsy-6

Identifiers
- Symbol: lsy-6
- Rfam: RF00823
- miRBase family: MIPF0000265

Other data
- RNA type: microRNA
- Domain(s): Eukaryota; Metazoa; Nematoda;
- PDB structures: PDBe

lsy-6 microRNA belongs to the class of miRNAs; these function to regulate the expression levels of other genes by several mechanisms. lsy-6 is a short non-coding RNA molecule and the first miRNA identified as having a role in nervous system development. It regulates left-right neuronal asymmetry in the nematode worm Caenorhabditis elegans.

== Left-right asymmetry through the cog-1 gene ==
ASEL and ASER are a pair of bilateral taste receptor neurons thought to be responsible for the asymmetrical pattern of chemoreceptor gene expression in C. elegans. These two gustatory neurons are bilaterally symmetric morphologically, as well as with regard to their connectivity, position and gene expression patterns. However, they are left-right asymmetric in their expression of specific signalling molecules. The ASE neuron is extremely sensitive to the correct dosage of cog-1, an Nkx-type homeobox gene, and extra copies of this gene will readily produce left/right asymmetry defects.

lsy-6 is responsible for control of cog-1 expression, as transcriptional mechanisms alone are not sufficient for this regulation. lsy-6 and cog-1 are initially co-expressed by both ASEL and ASER after birth, but their expression later becomes restricted to one of the two ASE neurons (ASEL for lsy-6 and ASER for cog-1). lsy-6 codes for a 21-nt miRNA, which in turn binds to a single complementary site in the 3′ UTR of the cog-1 gene. This interaction is only seen in the ASEL cell type (not the ASER), thus causing an asymmetric cog-1 distribution. It has been observed that a removal of lsy-6 leads to an altered transcription of cog-1 in ASEL, indicating that despite expressing lsy-6, the ASEL neuron does not transcribe cog-1.

== Further expression ==
lsy-6 is additionally expressed in several other neuron types, including labial sensory neurons and PVQ ventral cord interneurons.

== lsy-6/lsy-2 Feedback Loop ==
The expression of lsy-6 is itself regulated by lsy-2, a zinc finger transcription factor. Interaction of lsy-2 with lsy-6 has been found to be cell-type specific and there is complete loss of lsy-6 expression in lsy-2 mutant animals. A bistable feedback loop required for ASE laterality is in place, consisting of miRNAs lsy-6, mir-273, and their respective transcription factors cog-1 and die-1. Whilst lsy-6 is expressed in ASEL but not ASER and regulates the expression of the downstream transcription factor cog-1, mir-273 expression is strongly biased towards ASER and exhibits complementarity to the mRNA of the die-1 transcription factor. die-1 is regulated at a post-transcriptional level and controls chemosensory laterality by activating the expression of lsy-6 in ASEL only. Expression of die-1 in ASER is downregulated through two sites in its 3′ UTR region.

== See also ==
- MicroRNA
