= COG2 =

Protein-coding gene in humans

Identifiers
- Aliases: COG2, LDLC, component of oligomeric golgi complex 2, CDG2Q
- External IDs: OMIM: 606974; MGI: 1923582; GeneCards: COG2

Gene location (Human)
| Chr. | Chromosome 1 (human) |
| Band | 1q42.2 | Start | 230,642,481 bp |
| Band | 1q42.2 | End | 230,693,982 bp |

Gene location (Mouse)
| Chr. | Chromosome 8 (mouse) |
| Band | 8|8 E2 | Start | 125,247,506 bp |
| Band | 8|8 E2 | End | 125,278,747 bp |
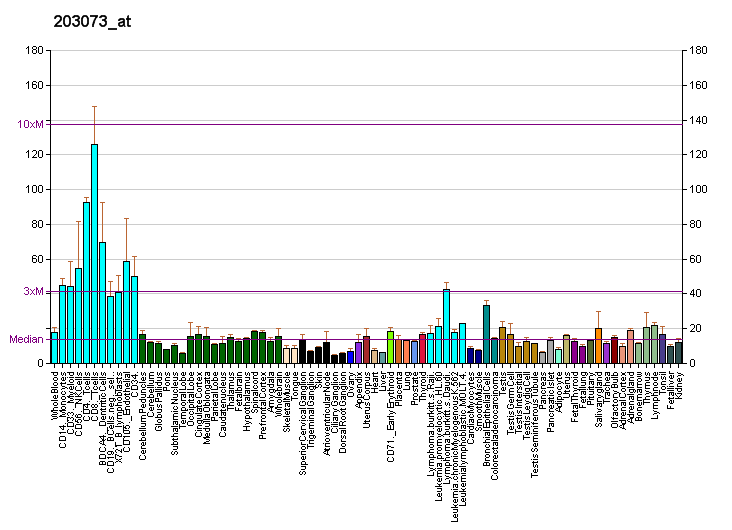
RNA expression pattern
| Bgee | Human / Mouse (ortholog); Top expressed in: rectum; right hemisphere of cerebellum; right adrenal cortex; pancreatic ductal cell; islet of Langerhans; gonad; left adrenal gland; left adrenal cortex; granulocyte; tibialis anterior muscle / Top expressed in: yolk sac; lens; granulocyte; spermatocyte; right kidney; neural layer of retina; epithelium of stomach; muscle of thigh; proximal tubule; spermatid; More reference expression data |
| BioGPS | More reference expression data |
Gene ontology
| Molecular function | protein binding; protein-containing complex binding |
| Cellular component | Golgi transport complex; cytosol; Golgi membrane; Golgi stack; Golgi apparatus; membrane; trans-Golgi network membrane |
| Biological process | protein transport; endoplasmic reticulum to Golgi vesicle-mediated transport; intra-Golgi vesicle-mediated transport; Golgi organization |
Sources:Amigo / QuickGO
Orthologs
| Databases | NCBI: entry; OMA: entry |
| Species | Human | Mouse |
| Entrez | 22796 | 76332 |
| Ensembl | ENSG00000135775 | ENSMUSG00000031979 |
| UniProt | Q14746 | Q921L5 |
| RefSeq (mRNA) | NM_007357; NM_001145036 | NM_029746 |
| RefSeq (protein) | NP_001138508; NP_031383 | NP_084022 |
| Location (UCSC) | Chr 1: 230.64 – 230.69 Mb | Chr 8: 125.25 – 125.28 Mb |
| PubMed search |
- Wikidata
| View/Edit Human | View/Edit Mouse |

Conserved oligomeric Golgi complex subunit 2 is a protein that in humans is encoded by the COG2 gene.

Multiprotein complexes are key determinants of Golgi apparatus structure and its capacity for intracellular transport and glycoprotein modification. Several complexes have been identified, including the Golgi transport complex (GTC), the LDLC complex, which is involved in glycosylation reactions, and the SEC34 complex, which is involved in vesicular transport. These 3 complexes are identical and have been termed the conserved oligomeric Golgi (COG) complex, which includes COG2 (Ungar et al., 2002).

== Interactions ==
COG2 has been shown to interact with COG4 and COG3.
