= COG4 =

Protein-coding gene in the species Homo sapiens

Identifiers
- Aliases: COG4, CDG2J, COD1, component of oligomeric golgi complex 4, SWILS
- External IDs: OMIM: 606976; MGI: 2142808; GeneCards: COG4
Available structures
PDB	Ortholog search: PDBe RCSB
PDB	List of PDB id codes 3HR0

Gene location (Human)
Chr.	Chromosome 16 (human)
Band	16q22.1	Start	70,480,568 bp
Band	16q22.1	End	70,523,560 bp

Gene location (Mouse)
Chr.	Chromosome 8 (mouse)
Band	8 E1|8 57.76 cM	Start	111,573,232 bp
Band	8 E1|8 57.76 cM	End	111,608,859 bp
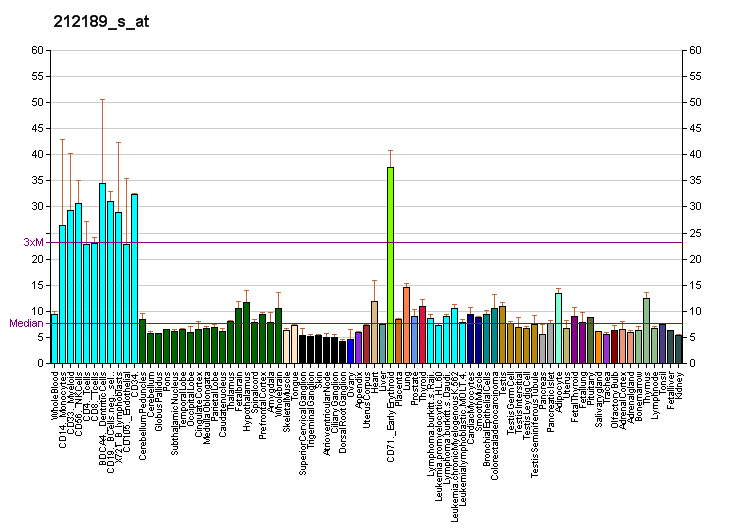
RNA expression pattern
Bgee	Human / Mouse (ortholog); Top expressed in: mucosa of transverse colon; apex of heart; muscle of thigh; right testis; granulocyte; gastrocnemius muscle; rectum; left testis; ventricular zone; right adrenal gland / Top expressed in: interventricular septum; spermatocyte; spermatid; internal carotid artery; muscle of thigh; external carotid artery; facial motor nucleus; skeletal muscle tissue; right kidney; proximal tubule; More reference expression data
BioGPS	More reference expression data
Gene ontology
Molecular function	protein binding; identical protein binding
Cellular component	Golgi transport complex; Golgi membrane; Golgi apparatus; membrane; trans-Golgi network membrane; cytoplasm; cytosol
Biological process	protein transport; endoplasmic reticulum to Golgi vesicle-mediated transport; retrograde transport, vesicle recycling within Golgi; Golgi vesicle prefusion complex stabilization; retrograde vesicle-mediated transport, Golgi to endoplasmic reticulum; Golgi organization
Sources:Amigo / QuickGO
Orthologs
Databases	NCBI: entry; OMA: entry
Species	Human	Mouse
Entrez	25839	102339
Ensembl	ENSG00000103051	ENSMUSG00000031753
UniProt	Q9H9E3	Q8R1U1
RefSeq (mRNA)	NM_001195139; NM_015386; NM_001365426; NM_145818	NM_133973; NM_001310607
RefSeq (protein)	NP_001182068; NP_056201; NP_001352355	NP_001297536; NP_598734
Location (UCSC)	Chr 16: 70.48 – 70.52 Mb	Chr 8: 111.57 – 111.61 Mb
PubMed search
- Wikidata
View/Edit Human	View/Edit Mouse

Conserved oligomeric Golgi complex subunit 4 is a protein that in humans is encoded by the COG4 gene.

Multiprotein complexes are key determinants of Golgi apparatus structure and its capacity for intracellular transport and glycoprotein modification. Several complexes have been identified, including the Golgi transport complex (GTC), the LDLC complex, which is involved in glycosylation reactions, and the SEC34 complex, which is involved in vesicular transport. These 3 complexes are identical and have been termed the conserved oligomeric Golgi (COG) complex, which includes COG4 (Ungar et al., 2002).[supplied by OMIM]

== Interactions ==
COG4 has been shown to interact with COG7, COG2, COG1 and COG5.

== Clinical ==
Mutations in this gene have been associated with Saul-Wilson syndrome.
