= COG5 =

Protein-coding gene in the species Homo sapiens

Identifiers
- Aliases: COG5, CDG2I, GOLTC1, GTC90, component of oligomeric golgi complex 5
- External IDs: OMIM: 606821; MGI: 2145130; GeneCards: COG5

Gene location (Human)
Chr.	Chromosome 7 (human)
Band	7q22.3	Start	107,201,555 bp
Band	7q22.3	End	107,564,514 bp

Gene location (Mouse)
Chr.	Chromosome 12 (mouse)
Band	12|12 A3	Start	31,704,868 bp
Band	12|12 A3	End	31,987,629 bp
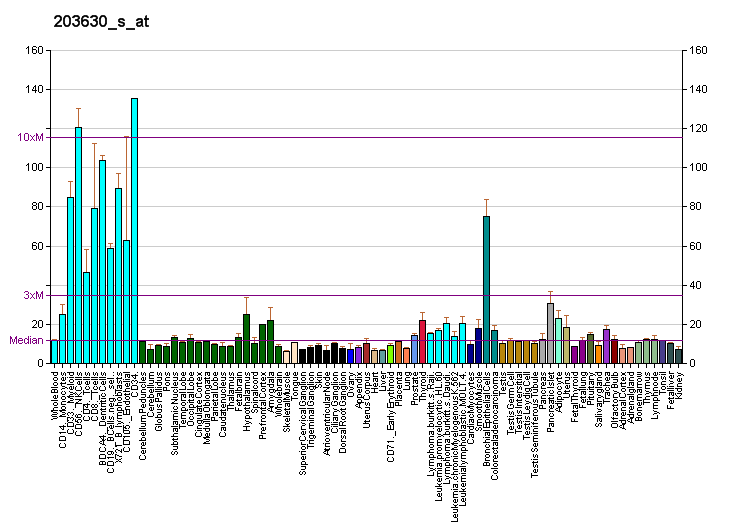

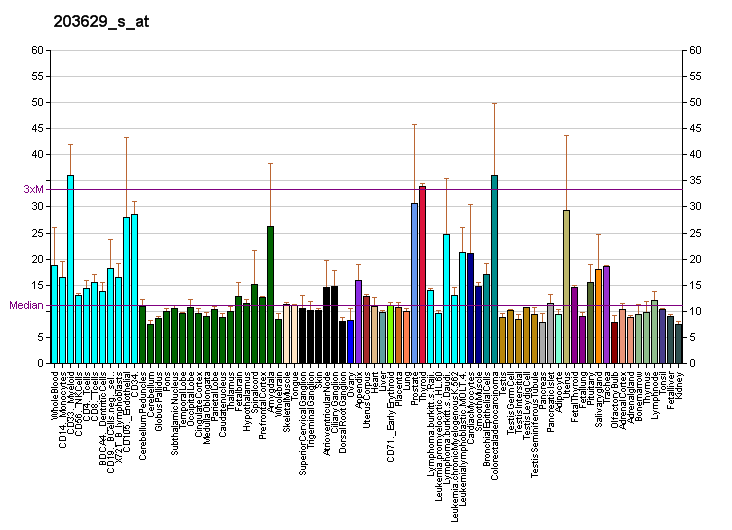
RNA expression pattern
Bgee	Human / Mouse (ortholog); Top expressed in: corpus callosum; Achilles tendon; bone marrow cell; sural nerve; tonsil; epithelium of colon; skeletal muscle tissue; endometrium; smooth muscle tissue; right auricle of heart / Top expressed in: genital tubercle; tail of embryo; spermatocyte; ciliary body; spermatid; right ventricle; dentate gyrus of hippocampal formation granule cell; thymus; neural layer of retina; carotid body; More reference expression data
BioGPS	More reference expression data
Gene ontology
Molecular function	protein binding; molecular function
Cellular component	cytoplasm; Golgi transport complex; Golgi membrane; cytosol; Golgi apparatus; membrane; nucleoplasm; trans-Golgi network membrane
Biological process	protein transport; endoplasmic reticulum to Golgi vesicle-mediated transport; intra-Golgi vesicle-mediated transport; transport
Sources:Amigo / QuickGO
Orthologs
Databases	NCBI: entry; OMA: entry
Species	Human	Mouse
Entrez	10466	238123
Ensembl	ENSG00000164597; ENSG00000284369	ENSMUSG00000035933
UniProt	Q9UP83	Q8C0L8
RefSeq (mRNA)	NM_001161520; NM_006348; NM_181733	NM_001163126
RefSeq (protein)	NP_001154992; NP_006339; NP_859422; NP_001366440; NP_001366441 NP_001366442; NP_001366443; NP_001366444; NP_001366445	NP_001156598
Location (UCSC)	Chr 7: 107.2 – 107.56 Mb	Chr 12: 31.7 – 31.99 Mb
PubMed search
- Wikidata
View/Edit Human	View/Edit Mouse

Conserved oligomeric Golgi complex subunit 5 is a protein that in humans is encoded by the COG5 gene.

Multiprotein complexes are key determinants of Golgi apparatus structure and its capacity for intracellular transport and glycoprotein modification. Several complexes have been identified, including the Golgi transport complex (GTC), the LDLC complex, which is involved in glycosylation reactions, and the SEC34 complex, which is involved in vesicular transport. These 3 complexes are identical and have been termed the conserved oligomeric Golgi (COG) complex, which includes COG5 (Ungar et al., 2002).[supplied by OMIM]

== Interactions ==
COG5 has been shown to interact with COG7 and COG4.
