= Autosomal dominant intellectual disability-craniofacial anomalies-cardiac defects syndrome =

- Other names: Intellectual disability-craniofacial anomalies-cardiac defects syndrome, Arboleda-Tham syndrome, KAT6A syndrome, autosomal dominant intellectual disability 32, (obsolete) autosomal dominant mental retardation 32
- Specialty: Medical genetics
- Symptoms: Multi-systemic
- Complications: Death with untreated cardiac defects
- Usual onset: Birth
- Duration: Lifelong
- Causes: Genetic mutation
- Prevention: None
- Prognosis: Poor if untreated
- Frequency: Rare, only 78 cases have been described in medical literature.
- Deaths: -

Autosomal dominant intellectual disability-craniofacial anomalies-cardiac defects syndrome is a rare genetic disorder which is characterized by multi-systemic symptoms primarily affecting the intellect and post-natal development.

== Signs and symptoms ==
Symptoms within people with the disorder vary, but they are generally the following:

=== Intellectual ===
- Intellectual disabilities

=== Developmental ===
- Widespread developmental delays
- Speech delays (which can sometimes last into adulthood)
- Feeding difficulties

=== Intestinal ===
- Acid reflux
- Chronic constipation

=== Cardiac ===
- Atrial septal defect
- Ventricular septal defect
- Patent foramen ovale
- Persistent ductus arteriosus

=== Ocular ===
- Strabismus
- Amblyopia
- Refractory errors

=== Facial ===
- Broad nose
- Thin upper lip
- Bitemporal narrowing
- Microcephaly
- Round face

Less common symptoms include craniosynostosis, autism, sleep disturbance, epilepsy, recurrent viral infections.

== Causes ==
This condition is caused by heterozygous mutations in the KAT6A gene, in chromosome 8. These mutations are often sporadic, and are either frameshift, missense, and nonsense.

== Diagnosis ==
Diagnosis of the disorder is established by gene sequencing.

== Epidemiology ==
According to OMIM, 78 cases have been described in medical literature.
