= COG3 =

Protein-coding gene in the species Homo sapiens

Identifiers
- Aliases: COG3, SEC34, component of oligomeric golgi complex 3
- External IDs: OMIM: 606975; MGI: 2450151; GeneCards: COG3

Gene location (Human)
Chr.	Chromosome 13 (human)
Band	13q14.13	Start	45,464,898 bp
Band	13q14.13	End	45,536,701 bp

Gene location (Mouse)
Chr.	Chromosome 14 (mouse)
Band	14|14 D3	Start	75,939,790 bp
Band	14|14 D3	End	75,991,998 bp
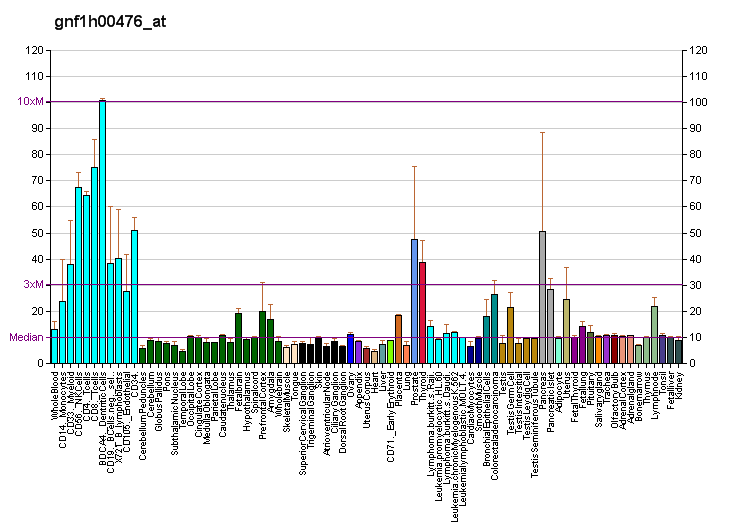
RNA expression pattern
Bgee	Human / Mouse (ortholog); Top expressed in: body of pancreas; right lobe of liver; Achilles tendon; rectum; olfactory zone of nasal mucosa; monocyte; mucosa of ileum; granulocyte; pancreatic ductal cell; left adrenal cortex / Top expressed in: otolith organ; utricle; Paneth cell; cumulus cell; seminal vesicula; hand; ciliary body; medullary collecting duct; lacrimal gland; iris; More reference expression data
BioGPS	More reference expression data
Gene ontology
Molecular function	protein binding
Cellular component	Golgi membrane; cis-Golgi network; membrane; Golgi apparatus; Golgi cisterna membrane; Golgi transport complex; trans-Golgi network membrane; cytosol; plasma membrane
Biological process	protein glycosylation; intracellular protein transport; protein stabilization; intra-Golgi vesicle-mediated transport; endoplasmic reticulum to Golgi vesicle-mediated transport; protein transport; Golgi organization; protein localization to organelle; retrograde vesicle-mediated transport, Golgi to endoplasmic reticulum
Sources:Amigo / QuickGO
Orthologs
Databases	NCBI: entry; OMA: entry
Species	Human	Mouse
Entrez	83548	338337
Ensembl	ENSG00000136152	ENSMUSG00000034893
UniProt	Q96JB2	Q8CI04
RefSeq (mRNA)	NM_001204476; NM_031431	NM_177381
RefSeq (protein)	NP_113619	n/a
Location (UCSC)	Chr 13: 45.46 – 45.54 Mb	Chr 14: 75.94 – 75.99 Mb
PubMed search
- Wikidata
View/Edit Human	View/Edit Mouse

Conserved oligomeric Golgi complex subunit 3 is a protein that in humans is encoded by the COG3 gene.

The protein encoded by this gene has similarity to a yeast protein. It seems to be part of a peripheral membrane protein complex localized on cis/medial Golgi cisternae where it may participate in tethering intra-Golgi transport vesicles.

== Interactions ==
COG3 has been shown to interact with COG2 and COG1.
