= Cytoskeleton associated protein 2 like =

Protein found in humans

CKAP2L

Identifiers
- Aliases: CKAP2L, cytoskeleton associated protein 2 like
- External IDs: OMIM: 616174; MGI: 1917716; GeneCards: CKAP2L

Gene location (Human)
Chr.	Chromosome 2 (human)
Band	2q14.1	Start	112,736,349 bp
Band	2q14.1	End	112,764,664 bp

Gene location (Mouse)
Chr.	Chromosome 2 (mouse)
Band	2|2 F1	Start	129,110,130 bp
Band	2|2 F1	End	129,139,132 bp
RNA expression pattern
Bgee	Human / Mouse (ortholog); Top expressed in: ventricular zone; ganglionic eminence; gonad; testicle; oocyte; secondary oocyte; bone marrow cell; trabecular bone; stromal cell of endometrium; appendix / Top expressed in: otic vesicle; hand; genital tubercle; ventricular zone; Paneth cell; superior cervical ganglion; tail of embryo; maxillary prominence; spermatid; zygote; More reference expression data
BioGPS	n/a
Orthologs
Databases	NCBI: entry; OMA: entry
Species	Human	Mouse
Entrez	150468	70466
Ensembl	ENSG00000169607	ENSMUSG00000048327
UniProt	Q8IYA6	Q7TS74
RefSeq (mRNA)	NM_001304361; NM_152515	NM_181589
RefSeq (protein)	NP_001291290; NP_689728	NP_853620
Location (UCSC)	Chr 2: 112.74 – 112.76 Mb	Chr 2: 129.11 – 129.14 Mb
PubMed search
- Wikidata
View/Edit Human	View/Edit Mouse

Cytoskeleton associated protein 2 like is a protein that in humans is encoded by the CKAP2L gene.

== Function ==
The protein encoded by this gene is thought to be a mitotic spindle protein important to neural stem or progenitor cells. Mutations in this gene have been associated with spindle organization defects, including mitotic spindle defects, lagging chromosomes, and chromatin bridges. There is evidence that mutations in this gene are associated with Filippi syndrome, characterized by growth defects, microcephaly, intellectual disability, facial feature defects, and syndactyly. There is a pseudogene of this gene on chromosome 20. Alternative splicing results in multiple transcript variants. [provided by RefSeq, Jan 2015].
