= Superior limbic keratoconjunctivitis =

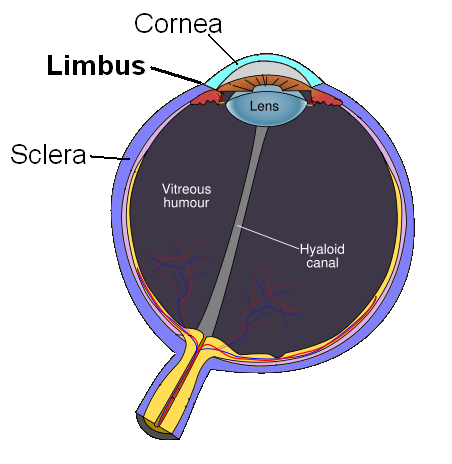
- SLK develops due to repeated corneal microtrauma of the cornea and limbus
- Specialty: Ophthalmology
- Symptoms: Eye redness, burning sensation, tearing
- Duration: Chronic
- Risk factors: Corneal microtrauma, hyperthyroidism, hyperparathyroidism
- Treatment: Topical corticosteroids, artificial tears, surgery
- Prognosis: Exacerbations decrease with age

Superior limbic keratoconjunctivitis (SLK, Théodore's syndrome) is a disease of the eye characterized by episodes of recurrent inflammation of the superior cornea and limbus, as well as of the superior tarsal and bulbar conjunctiva. It was first described by F. H. Théodore in 1963.

== Symptoms and signs ==
Patients present with red eye, burning, tearing, foreign body sensation and mild photophobia. Upon examination, the conjunctiva appears inflamed and thickened, especially at the limbus.

== Pathophysiology ==
The development and pathophysiology of SLK is not well understood, but appears to involve microtrauma of keratoconjunctival surfaces. This mechanical hypothesis is supported by the increased lid apposition of exophthalmic thyroid patients, who are known to have an increased incidence of superior limbic keratoconjunctivitis.

== Treatment ==
First-line treatments include topical corticosteroids and artificial tears. For non-responsive cases, potential treatments include topical ciclosporin A, vitamin A, autologous serum and injections of triamcinolone. Surgical treatment options include thermocauterization of the bulbar conjunctiva and conjunctival resection, typically under rose bengal (RB) staining to visualize affected areas.

== Epidemiology ==
Superior limbic keratoconjunctivitis tends to occur more often with dry eye syndrome (keratoconjunctivitis sicca), hyperthyroidism and hyperparathyroidism. It is also a rare complication associated with rheumatoid arthritis. Rarely, it may occur as a consequence of upper eyelid blepharoplasty surgery.
