= Spondylo-meta-epiphyseal dysplasia =

- This condition is inherited in an autosomal recessive manner.

Spondylo-meta-epiphyseal dysplasia (SMED) is a rare autosomal-recessive disease that causes skeletal disorders. SMED is thought to be caused by a mutation in the Discoidin Domain Receptor 2 (DDR2) gene.

== See also ==
- Spondyloepimetaphyseal dysplasia-short limb-abnormal calcification syndrome
