= Wildlife endocrinology =

Branch of endocrinology

Wildlife endocrinology is a branch of endocrinology which deals with the study of the endocrine system in vertebrates as well as invertebrates. It deals with hormone analysis which helps understand the basic physiological functions such as metabolic activity, reproduction, health and well-being of the organism. Hormones can be measured via multiple biological matrices such as blood, urine, faeces, hair and saliva, the choice of which depends upon the type of information required, ease of sample collection, assays available to analyse the sample and species difference in hormone metabolism and excretion. Non-invasive samples are preferred for wild ranging animals whereas, both invasive as well as non-invasive samples are used to study captive animals.

== Background ==
Wildlife endocrinology can help understand the mechanisms by which organisms cope with changing environment and therefore plays an important role in wildlife conservation. Field endocrine strategies have progressed quickly as of late and can give considerable data on the growth, stress, and reproductive status of individual creatures, in this manner giving knowledge into current and future reactions of populations to changes in the earth. Ecological stressors and regenerative status can be recognized nonlethally by estimating various endocrine-related endpoints, like steroids for plasma, living and nonliving tissue, urine, and feces. Data on the natural or endocrine necessities of individual species for typical development, advancement, and multiplication will give basic data to species and environment preservation. For some taxa, essential data on endocrinology is missing, and progress in preservation endocrinology will require approaches that are both "fundamental" and "applied" and incorporate reconciliation of research center and field approaches.

== Sampling methods in wildlife endocrinology ==
Sampling always depends upon the feasibility of the sampling protocol. If one is assessing the health of humans or captive, based on what kind of information one is seeking, sampling can change. In case of animals, it is easier to conduct blood sampling or collection of tissues from captive animals. Here one needs to be in closer contact with the target individual. But when working with wild animals, this might not be possible and thus other methods of sampling such as non-invasive sampling can be done. On the basis of invasiveness, there are two types of sampling.

=== Invasive sampling ===
Blood and tissue sampling is known to be invasive sampling. Invasive samples are difficult to collect but at the same time provide data about the current situation. DNA, hormone levels, infections and the overall health of the organism can all be tested from a single blood sample. Despite being advantageous for providing more information, most of the researchers prefer non-invasive sampling methods.

=== Non-invasive sampling ===
In the case of animals, such invasive sampling requires restraining or capture of the individual. Drawing blood or taking out tissues is still easier from captive animals but for wild animals, it becomes very difficult. The animal either needs to be trapped or tranquilized, which in many cases is logistically impossible for wild animals. Further, in case of cortisol measurement, restraining during blood sample collection may itself be a stressor and may potentially lead to increased levels of stress hormones. Thus, to overcome this, non-invasive sampling can be carried out which is easier to collect and does not harm the animals. Following are a few examples of non-invasive samples that can be collected from animal species, depending on the suitability of the sampling procedure:

● Hair

● Feathers

● Urine

● Saliva

● Fecal matter (FM)

Hair, urine, saliva and feces can be easily collected from captive as well as wild animals. This can be done in a majority of animal taxa including most of the reptiles, aves, mammals and amphibians
