= KAT6A =

Protein-coding gene in the species Homo sapiens

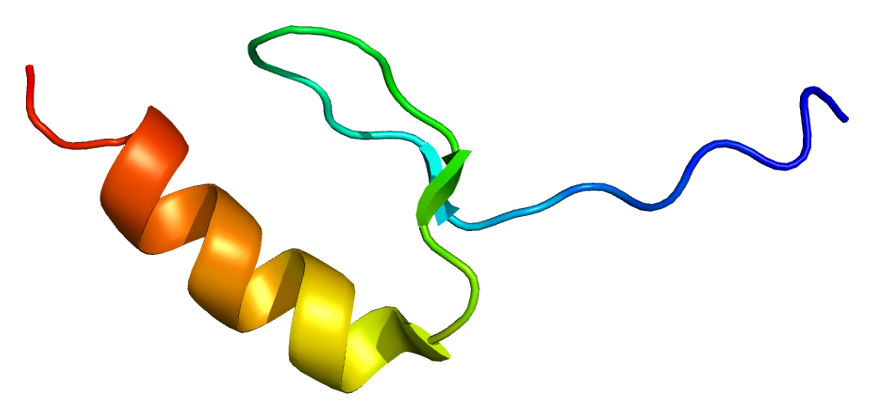

Identifiers
- Aliases: KAT6A, MOZ, MYST3, RUNXBP2, ZC2HC6A, ZNF220, MRD32, MYST-3, lysine acetyltransferase 6A, ARTHS
- External IDs: OMIM: 601408; MGI: 2442415; GeneCards: KAT6A
Available structures
| PDB | Ortholog search: PDBe RCSB |
| PDB | List of PDB id codes 1M36, 2LN0, 2OZU, 2RC4, 3V43, 4LJN, 4LK9, 4LKA, 4LLB |
Enzyme activity
| EC # | BRENDA | ExPASy | KEGG | MetaCyc |
|---|---|---|---|---|
| 2.3.1.48 | ↗ | ↗ | ↗ | ↗ |

Gene location (Human)
| Chr. | Chromosome 8 (human) |
| Band | 8p11.21 | Start | 41,929,479 bp |
| Band | 8p11.21 | End | 42,051,994 bp |

Gene location (Mouse)
| Chr. | Chromosome 8 (mouse) |
| Band | 8|8 A2 | Start | 23,349,551 bp |
| Band | 8|8 A2 | End | 23,433,275 bp |
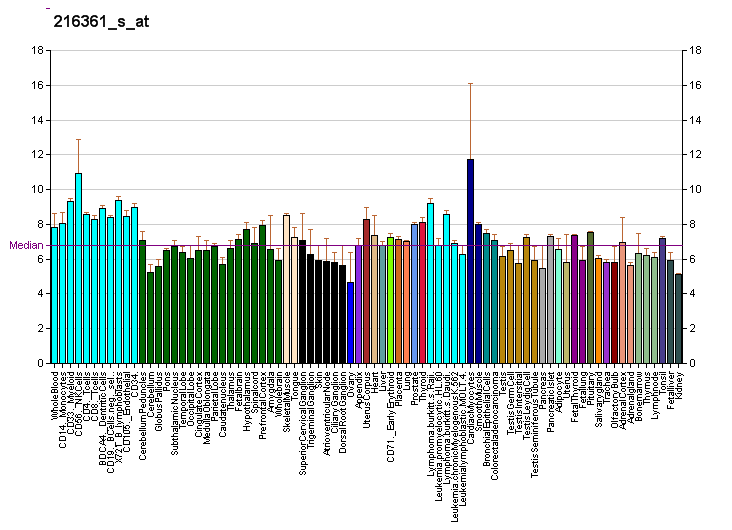

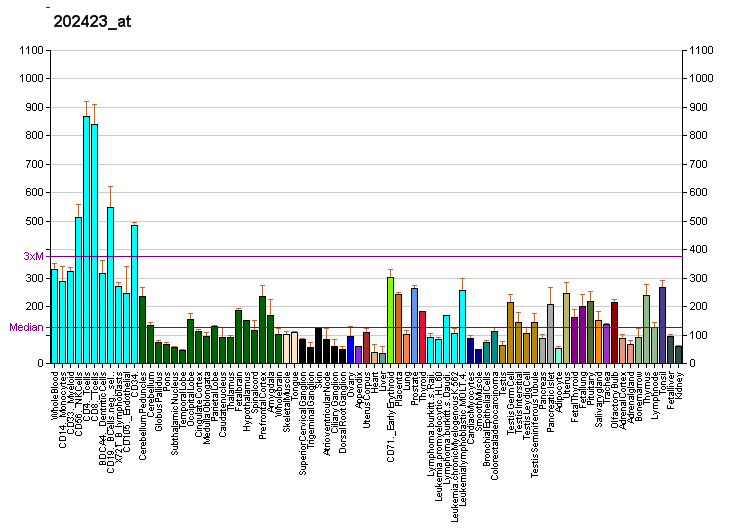
RNA expression pattern
| Bgee | Human / Mouse (ortholog); Top expressed in: nipple; internal globus pallidus; lactiferous duct; skin of arm; skin of thigh; mucosa of ileum; skin of hip; epithelium of colon; cardia; vulva / Top expressed in: Gonadal ridge; retinal pigment epithelium; molar; tibiofemoral joint; lacrimal gland; left lung lobe; cerebellar vermis; vas deferens; ciliary body; blood; More reference expression data |
| BioGPS | More reference expression data |
Gene ontology
| Molecular function | transferase activity; DNA binding; transcription coactivator activity; transcription factor binding; metal ion binding; histone acetyltransferase activity; protein binding; acyltransferase activity; acetyltransferase activity; zinc ion binding; H4 histone acetyltransferase activity; histone binding |
| Cellular component | PML body; nucleosome; MOZ/MORF histone acetyltransferase complex; nucleus; nucleoplasm; nucleolus; cytosol; nuclear speck; histone acetyltransferase complex |
| Biological process | animal organ development; nucleosome assembly; myeloid cell differentiation; regulation of transcription, DNA-templated; transcription, DNA-templated; positive regulation of transcription, DNA-templated; cellular senescence; histone H3 acetylation; negative regulation of transcription, DNA-templated; protein acetylation; regulation of signal transduction by p53 class mediator; histone acetylation; chromatin organization; histone H4 acetylation; positive regulation of transcription by RNA polymerase II |
Sources:Amigo / QuickGO
Orthologs
| Databases | NCBI: entry; OMA: entry |
| Species | Human | Mouse |
| Entrez | 7994 | 244349 |
| Ensembl | ENSG00000083168 | ENSMUSG00000031540 |
| UniProt | Q92794 | Q8BZ21 |
| RefSeq (mRNA) | NM_001099412; NM_001099413; NM_001305878; NM_006766 | NM_001081149; NM_001364449 |
| RefSeq (protein) | NP_001292807; NP_006757 | NP_001074618; NP_001351378 |
| Location (UCSC) | Chr 8: 41.93 – 42.05 Mb | Chr 8: 23.35 – 23.43 Mb |
| PubMed search |
- Wikidata
| View/Edit Human | View/Edit Mouse |

K(lysine) acetyltransferase 6A (KAT6A), is an enzyme that, in humans, is encoded by the KAT6A gene. This gene is located on human chromosome 8, band 8p11.21.

== Protein function ==
The KAT6A protein contains two nuclear localization domains, a C_{2}HC_{3} zinc finger and an acetyltransferase domain. This structure suggests that KAT6A functions as a chromatin-bound acetyltransferase. KAT6A is important for the proper development of hematopoietic stem cells.

== Arboleda-Tham syndrome ==
Arboleda-Tham syndrome (ARTHS), also referred to as KAT6A Syndrome (Arboleda-Tham Syndrome), is a rare autosomal dominant developmental disorder, caused by various missense, nonsense, and frameshift mutations in the KAT6A gene. The main characteristics of this syndrome are developmental delay, impaired intellectual development, speech delay, microcephaly, cardiac anomalies, and gastrointestinal complications.
