= Exophthalmometer =

Ophthalmic instrument

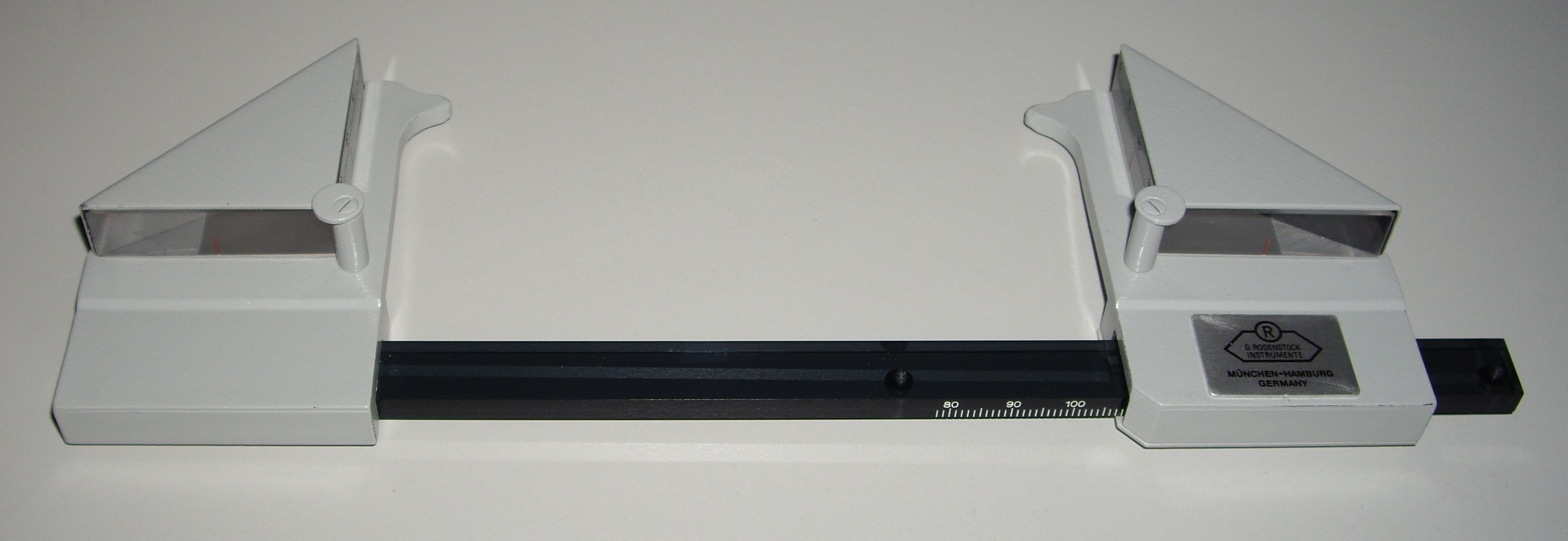
An Exophthalmometer

An exophthalmometer is an instrument used for measuring the degree of forward displacement of the eye in exophthalmos. The device allows measurement of the forward distance of the lateral orbital rim to the front of the cornea. Exophthalmometers can also identify enophthalmos (retraction of the eye into the orbit), a sign of blow-out fracture or certain neoplasms.

== Methods ==
There are several types of exophthalmometers: Hertel and Luedde exophthalmometers measure the distance of the corneal apex from the level of the lateral orbital rim, while Naugle exophthalmometers measure the relative difference between each eye.

- Hertel exophthalmometers take a measurement from the lateral orbital rim to the corneal apex. If a patient presents with an orbital fracture or after lateral orbitotomy, the use of a Hertel exophthalmometer may be complicated because the lateral orbital rim serves as a reference point for this instrument. Consideration should be given to the use of the Naugle exophthalmometer in these cases.
- Naugle exophthalmometers use fixation points slightly above and below the superior and inferior orbital rims (cheek bones and forehead). Naugle exophthalmometers measure the difference in proptosis between the two eyes, in contrast to the absolute measure obtained with the Hertel method.
- Luedde exophthalmometers fix on the lateral orbital wall and use a transparent ruler to measure the amount of protrusion.

== Normal values ==
The normal range is 12–21 mm. Upper normal limit for people of African origin is a little higher, about 23–24 mm.

A difference greater than 2 mm between the eyes is significant.

In children and teenagers mean exophthalmometric measurements increase with age: Less than 4 years old (13.2 mm), 5–8 years old (14.4 mm), 9–12 years old (15.2 mm) and 13–17 years old (16.2 mm).

Axial Length of the eye affects exophthalmometer reading. Pseudoproptosis may be seen in severe myopia.
