= Conserved oligomeric Golgi complex =

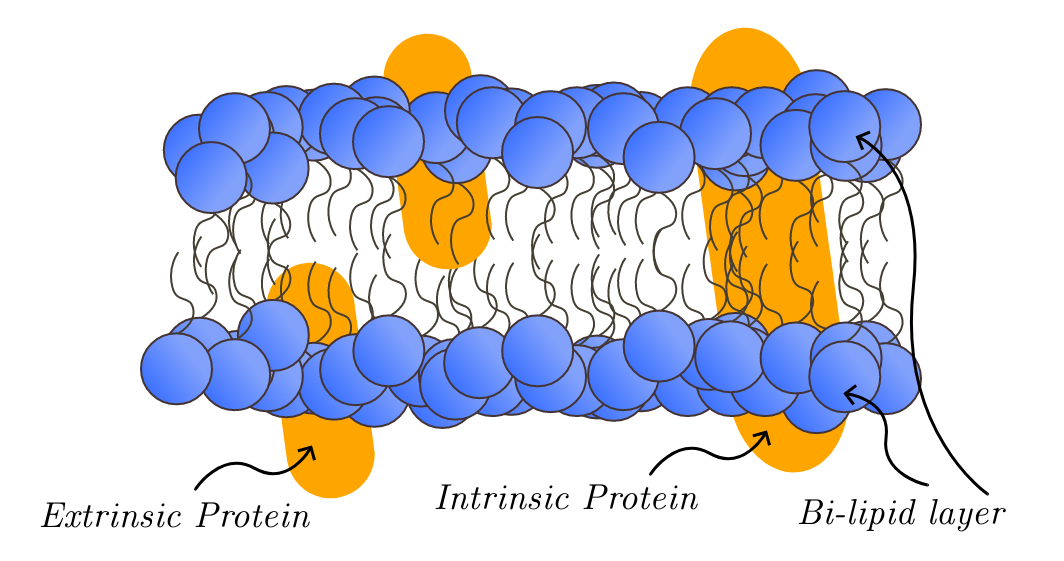
This image depicts the location of where the COG complex could be found on the Golgi apparatus.

The conserved oligomeric Golgi complex, also known as the COG complex, is an extrinsic membrane protein found on the Golgi apparatus within eukaryotes. This complex is evolutionarily conserved and has homologous subunits found within every species of eukaryote. The COG complex was first discovered in 1981 in Chinese hamster ovary cells. These ovary cells had mutations in low-density lipoprotein (LDL) receptors, which affected the function of Golgi glycosylation enzymes. However, the COG complex as a whole was not fully understood until 2004 when a deficiency in one of the COG subunits was linked to congenital disorders of glycosylation. These findings led to the realization that the COG complex plays an important role in glycosylation and protein sorting.

== Structure ==
The COG complex is composed of two lobes that contain eight total subunits. The subunits are labeled numerically 1-8. The COG complex is attached to the outside membrane of the Golgi apparatus by protein-protein interactions due to the COG subunits lacking a transmembrane and lipid binding domain. The first lobe of the COG complex contains subunits Cog1-Cog4 and the second lobe contains subunits Cog5-Cog8. The lobes are connected by thin, rod-like complexes. The two lobes do not directly touch one another and instead have 3 distinct groupings that make the whole COG complex. The first cluster of subunits consists of Cog2, Cog3, and Cog4 and only connects to the Cog1 subunit. The second cluster of subunits consists of Cog5, Cog6, and Cog7 and only connects to the Cog8 subunit. The Cog1 and Cog8 subunits act as a bridge between the two clusters of subunits and are the middlemost group. When in its natural and undisturbed state, the COG complex appears as a glob and has a length of about 37 nm. When the COG complex is not in its regulated environment, it degrades into a structure that has many arms that are curved and have ends that resemble hooks; its total length in this state is about 50-75 nm (The COG complex has an average weight of 590-750 kDa; however, each species of eukaryote will have differing weights.

== COG's Role in Protein Sorting ==
Within the Golgi apparatus newly synthesized proteins are transported in from the endoplasmic reticulum, where they undergo post translational modifications and get directed into the proper cellular compartments. The COG complex acts as a multi-subunit tethering complex in which the binding sites are located on the outside of the subunits and provide the potential for fusion machinery to connect.The process begins when the Rab protein binds to GTP and signals for the rest of the complexes needed for vesicle fusion to come to the site. A coiled-coil tether will then latch on to the vesicle and begin to bring it closer to the membrane. The COG complex is able to connect to the proteins on the vesicle and place it into a position where the SNARE (soluble NSF attachment protein) complex can form and attach to the vesicle. Its role is to act as a bridge between the accepter and donor membranes. The exact order in which this process happens is still unknown. When the COG complex is mutated, it is unable to complete the tethering process, and the glycosylation enzymes are not able to be directed to their proper cellular compartments.

== COG's Role in Glycosylation ==
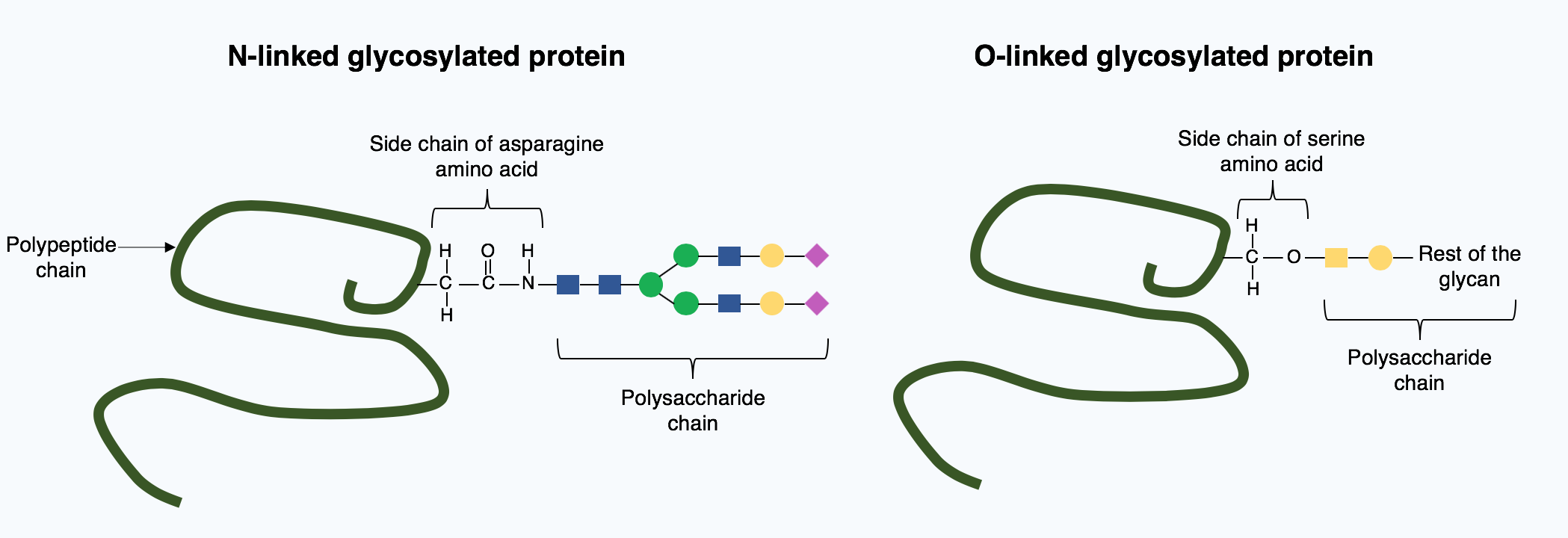
This is a depiction of the post-translational modification that occurs during N-linked and O-linked glycosylation.

Glycosylation is the posttranslational modification of proteins and lipids where an oligosaccharide is added. This process is necessary to ensure proteins will properly fold and remain stable once they leave the Golgi apparatus. Two types of glycosylation occur in the Golgi apparatus: N-linked and O-linked glycosylation(sci direct). N-linked glycosylation occurs when an oligosaccharide is attached to the amide group of asparagine residues. O-linked glycosylation occurs when the oligosaccharide is attached to a hydroxyl group of either a threonine or serine. This process requires several enzymes in order to be carried out; the main enzymes that accomplish the glycosylation are glycosyltransferases and glycosidases. The COG complex is responsible for maintaining a balance of the glycosylation enzymes. When the COG complex is dysfunctional, it results in at least five glycosylation enzymes (Golgi mannosidase II, β1,4-galactosyltransferase I, β1,3-galactosyltransferase, sialyltransferase, and GlcNAc transferase I) being degraded or directed into the wrong cellular compartment.

== Congenital Disorders of Glycosylation ==
Mutations that occur on the COG complex are responsible for a subset of autosomal recessive disorders known as Congenital Disorders of Glycosylation. These disorders have two types known as CDG-1 and CDG-2 and a cure has not yet been discovered. CDG-1 occurs when a lipid-linked oligosaccharide has a malfunction during synthesis or transfer. CDG-2 occurs when the glycosylation process is defective, more specifically when either the glycosyltransferases or glycosidases enzymes do not function properly. To be diagnosed with a congenital disorder of glycosylation, two different tests are performed; the first is isoelectric focusing. Isoelectric focusing involves separating out the asialylated and disialylated transferrin and measuring the levels found. Individuals with CDG-1 will have elevated levels of asialylated and disialylated transferrin. The second test is glycan mass spectrometry, which can show if there was a defect in the galactosylation and sialylation processes. Glycan mass spectrometry testing helps to diagnose CDG-2. Once diagnosed, individuals will also go through genotyping to determine which COG subunit possessed the mutation that caused their congenital disorder of glycosylation.

=== Health Issues Related to COG Subunit Mutations ===
Mutations within the COG subunits cause adverse health effects that typically result in an early death. Depending on the COG subunit that is mutated, some individuals may have longer life spans than those with other mutated subunits.

==== COG-1 ====
A mutation within the COG-1 subunit can cause a variety of health issues that include but are not limited to hypotonia, left ventricular hypertrophy (LVH), progressive microcephaly, mild hepatosplenomegaly, stunted growth, mental disabilities, trouble receiving nutrition by mouth, and slight cerebral and cerebellar atrophy. On the molecular level the mutation of COG-1 in one patient was found to be caused by the addition of one C nucleotide in between position 2659-2660 that resulted in a stop codon. This caused a loss of over 80 amino acid residues. Another mutation in the COG-1 subunit came from exon 6 being skipped, which caused a frameshift mutation of a G to an A at the 1070 position that resulted in the loss of 659 amino acids.

==== COG-2 ====
A mutation within the COG-2 subunit can cause a variety of health issues that include but are not limited to stunted growth, microcephaly, spastic quadriplegia, liver dysfunction without hepatosplenomegaly, hypocupremia, hypoceruloplasminemia, cerebral atrophy, and tonic seizures. On the molecular level, the mutation of COG-2 the patient was found to have two mutations; the first was a modification in an allele inherited from the father where a T was changed to G at the 1900 position, and the second was an inherited mutated allele from the mother.

==== COG-3 ====
At the current time of writing, no Congenital Disorders of Glycosylation have been found associated with a mutation in the COG-3 subunit.

==== COG-4 ====
A mutation within the COG-4 subunit can cause a variety of health issues that include but are not limited to severe developmental delay, hypotonia, inability to improve, seizures, coagulopathy, liver cirrhosis, mild ataxia, uncoordinated movements, bilateral cerebral atrophy of frontotemporal regions, and chronic infections. On the molecular level the mutation of the COG-4 subunit can come from a nonsense mutation that resulted in the COG-4 protein being depleted. This impacted the stability of lobe one.

==== COG-5 ====
A mutation within the COG-5 subunit can cause a variety of health issues that include but are not limited to mental disabilities, hypotonia, delayed speech development, liver cirrhosis, mild dysmorphia, hypohidrosis, hyperkeratosis of the skin, macular hypoplasia, coagulation defects, liver lesions, and microcephaly. On the molecular level the mutation of the COG-5 subunit can happen several ways. The first mutation discovered in a patient was the passing over of exons 15 and 16 which causes a loss of 58 amino acids. The second mutation discovered in a patient was a homozygous nonsense mutation in COG-5 where a G was replaced with a T at the 1780 position. The third mutation discovered in a patient was a missense mutation that caused the passing over of exon 16 which resulted in a heavy suppression of the COG-5 protein levels. The fourth mutation discovered in a patient was a frameshift mutation that created a premature stop codon leading to the function loss of COG-5.

==== COG-6 ====
A mutation within the COG-6 subunit can cause a variety of health issues that include but are not limited to focal seizures, intracranial bleeding, cholestasis, chronic inflammatory bowel disease, liver cirrhosis, hypohidrosis, abnormal teeth, palmoplantar hyperkeratosis, hepatitis, microcephaly, enamel hypoplasia, strabismus, splenomegaly, hypotonia, and vitamin K deficiency. On the molecular level the mutation of the COG-6 subunit is associated with a homozygous mutation that causes the substitution of a G to a T at the 1646 position. Other mutations for the COG-6 subunit were proposed but could not be definitively linked to causing a Congenital Disorder of Glycosylation.

==== COG-7 ====
Mutations in the COG-7 subunit are the most severe. A mutation within the COG-7 subunit can cause a variety of health issues that include but are not limited to perinatal asphyxia, dysmorphia, skeletal deformities, hypotonia, stunted growth, inability to improve, severe microcephaly, hypotonia, adducted thumbs, gastrointestinal pseudo-obstruction, cardiac anomalies, wrinkled skin, and hepatosplenomegaly. On the molecular level the mutation of the COG-7 subunit was observed to happen in one of two ways. The first mutation discovered was a homozygous intronic point mutation of an A to a C at the 169 position that resulted in 19 bases in the first exon being deleted. The second mutation discovered was another intronic mutation of an A to a G at the 170 position, but this mutation resulted in 6 base pairs being added in between exons 1 and 2.

==== COG-8 ====
A mutation within the COG-8 subunit can cause a variety of health issues that include but are not limited to acute encephalopathy, depletion of psychomotor abilities, mild dysmorphia, hypotonia, alternating esotropia, pseudo-ptosis, unregulated coagulation, mental disabilities, oculomotor apraxia with dysinergia oculocephalica, pseudo-ptosis, decreased reflexes, chronic axonal neuropathy, elevated serum liver enzymes, microcephaly, skeletal deformities, and alternating esotropia. On the molecular level the mutation of the COG-5 subunit can happen several ways. The first mutation observed in a patient was a nonsense mutation in which a C is replaced with a G at the 1611 position, which causes a premature stop codon and a loss of 76 amino acids. The second mutation observed in a patient was two heterozygous mutations; one was when a G was replaced with an A in the third intron, and the other was the loss of two nucleotides in exon 5. The third mutation observed in a patient was the change of a G to an A at the 1583 position.
