= Filippi syndrome =

- Other names: Syndactyly Type I with Microcephaly and Mental Retardation

Filippi syndrome, also known as Syndactyly Type I with Microcephaly and Intellectual Disability, is a very rare autosomal recessive genetic disease. Only a very limited number of cases have been reported to date. Filippi Syndrome is associated with diverse symptoms of varying severity across affected individuals, for example malformation of digits, craniofacial abnormalities, intellectual disability, and growth retardation. The diagnosis of Filippi Syndrome can be done through clinical observation, radiography, and genetic testing. Filippi Syndrome cannot be cured directly as of 2022, hence the main focus of treatments is on tackling the symptoms observed on affected individuals. It was first reported in 1985.

== Signs and symptoms ==
The symptoms of Filippi Syndrome can be congenital (apparent as an infant). The occurrence and severity of such symptoms are variable across affected individuals. The progression of symptoms over one's lifetime has not been thoroughly studied due to the small number of people with Filippi Syndrome globally.

=== Malformations of digits ===
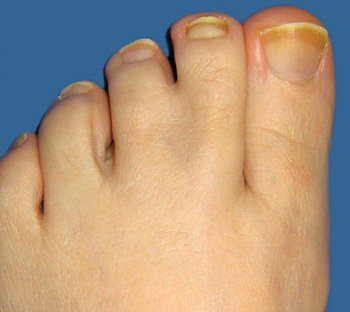
Syndactyly of the second and third toes.

Malformations of digits are expressed among people with Filippi Syndrome. One of the most common malformations is the webbing or fusion of digits, which is termed syndactyly. In particular, syndactyly of the third and fourth fingers or the second, third and fourth toes is termed "syndactyly type 1". The degree of syndactyly may differ across affected individuals, with some exhibiting syndactyly of soft tissues and skin only, and more severe cases exhibiting syndactyly of digital bones.

Other malformations of digits include clinodactyly (curving) of the fifth fingers and brachydactyly (abnormal shortening) of digits. Brachydactyly is believed to be largely due to abnormalities arising from the bones inside the hands and feet, specifically the metacarpals and metatarsals.

=== Craniofacial abnormalities ===
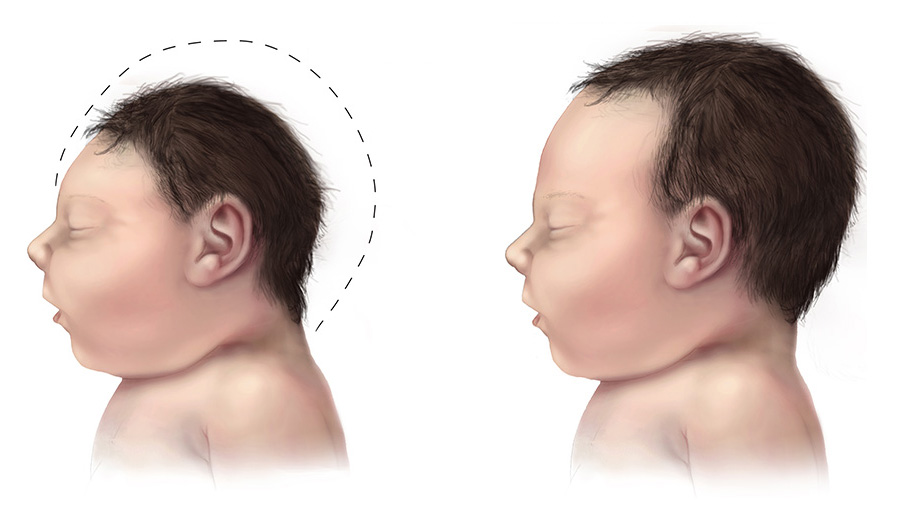
The microcephaly condition.

Furthermore, most people with Filippi Syndrome exhibit craniofacial abnormalities. Craniofacial abnormalities are birth defects observed at the head or face region of affected individuals. Some of the craniofacial abnormalities present in people with Filippi Syndrome include microcephaly (having a skull that is smaller than normal), prominent/ elevated nasal bridge, hypertelorism (having one's pair of eyes further apart from each other than normal), and underdeveloped nasal alae (underdeveloped tissues surrounding the nostril). Less common craniofacial abnormalities include having a broad forehead, thin vermilion border (having a thin upper lip), and frontal hirsutism (having a hairy forehead).

=== Intellectual disability ===
People with Filippi Syndrome may also demonstrate varying degrees of intellectual disability. Affected individuals may experience defective speech development, aphasia (experiencing difficulty in finding the appropriate words to use), vision impairment, and an inability to speak.

=== Growth retardation ===
Another characteristic symptom of people with Filippi Syndrome is the occurrence of growth retardation, which is also referred to as growth delay. Such growth delays may be either prenatal or postnatal, meaning that they can occur both before and after birth. In particular, delayed bone maturation can be observed in patients with Filippi Syndrome.

=== Other symptoms ===
People with Filippi Syndrome may exhibit some other physical abnormalities. Examples of such abnormalities include dwarfism (having a severely short stature), dislocated elbows, decreased joint mobility, muscular hypotonia (having weak muscle tone), and involuntary muscle stiffness.

They may also exhibit abnormal conditions at their skin and teeth. Moreover, a portion of affected males may demonstrate cryptorchidism (a condition in which the testes fail to descend into the scrotum).

== Causes ==
Filippi syndrome is a genetic disease with an autosomal recessive inheritance pattern at the Cytoskeleton Associated Protein 2 Like (CKAP2L) gene.

=== Inheritance pattern ===
An autosomal recessive inheritance pattern means that the disease trait is exhibited on an individual only when both copies of the disease gene in the individual demonstrate a specific pathogenic mutation. This happens when the individual inherits one copy of the mutated gene from each of their parents. In the case of Filippi Syndrome, both copies of the CKAP2L gene of an individual have to be mutated in order for them to demonstrate symptoms of the disorder.

=== CKAP2L gene ===
The CKAP2L gene is the human ortholog of the mouse CKAP2I (Radmis) gene. It contains 10 exons and is located on chromosome 2q14.1. It is a protein-coding gene that is associated with microtubules and some cellular structures involved in mitosis. The CKAP2L gene is essential for the proper formation of mitotic spindles during mitosis and the progression of the cell cycle of human cells. The expression pattern of the CKAP2L gene can explain the occurrence of syndactyly in Filippi Syndrome.

=== Mutations ===
The process of gene transcription and translation.

Multiple mutations at the CKAP2L gene can cause Filippi Syndrome. Some of these mutations include a 1-base pair duplication in exon 4, a 2-base pair insertion in exon 2, a 1-base pair deletion in exon 4, and a 329-base pair deletion in exon 4 of the gene. The above mutations cause a frameshift in the gene. A frameshift mutation refers to a condition in which the reading frame of the gene is disrupted by the insertion or deletion of base pairs from the gene (if the number of inserted or deleted base pairs is not divisible by three). This frameshift mutation ultimately results in a premature termination codon (the formation of a termination codon at a position more "forward" than normal). Other mutations include a base pair transition in the start codon, which is the starting site of translation of the gene. A transition mutation occurring at this codon disrupts the codon sequence and abolishes the site. This prevents the cell from carrying out translation of the gene.

== Diagnosis ==
The diagnosis of Filippi Syndrome is mostly done postnatally. Initial diagnosis of the disease relies on clinical observation of symptoms, including different degrees of syndactyly and craniofacial abnormalities, exhibited by affected individuals. Diagnosis can also be done through radiography, which checks for malformation of digits.

Confirmation of diagnosis requires the use of genetic testing. Specifically, it can be done through detecting mutations in the CKAP2L gene, of which a total of eight causative variants having been identified.

Genetic testing of Filippi Syndrome makes use of three major techniques:

- Whole Exome Sequencing, which focuses on sequencing the exons in the region of the genome coding for proteins.
- Next-generation Sequencing, which is a high-throughput genomic sequence analysis method that make use of flow cytometry, and is able to analyze gigabases of sequences in one instrument run.
- Array Based Techniques, which makes use of microarray applications to determine chromosomal abnormalities with greater precision compare to the conventional karyotyping tests.

== Treatment ==
Currently, Filippi Syndrome has no direct cure. It is treated according to observed symptoms on affected individuals.

=== Syndactyly release surgery ===
Syndactyly exhibit varying degrees of severity in individuals. Hence not all affected individuals with this condition must undergo surgical intervention. For example, syndactyly that occurs at the proximal end of the digits may have limited effect on the normal functioning of the hand and foot, and correction through surgery is optional.

Simple syndactyly is the condition of cutaneous fusion between two digits, and can be treated by surgically rebuilding the hourglass shape web space between digits. During surgery, incision is first carried out to separate the fused fingers. It is followed by reconstruction of the web space's side walls using dorsal advancement flaps or skin grafts obtained from the affected individual's groin. After reconstruction, additional fingerpulp flaps are required for rebuilding of the nailfold between the nail bed and the surrounding skin if there is the occurrence of syndactyly at the tip of the fingers.

Treatment for complex syndactyly, which refers to the bony fusion between two digits, has a higher degree of complexity. It involves the reconstruction of web space as well as highly specific surgical procedures with accordance to different types of bony fusion. It may also require separation and relocation of the flexor digitorum profundus or tendon-diverted transplantation if the structure of the tendons in the fused digits are also affected by syndactyly.

Professionals usually advice that affected individuals receive surgical treatment during the first two years of life to avoid hindrance to motor ability development.

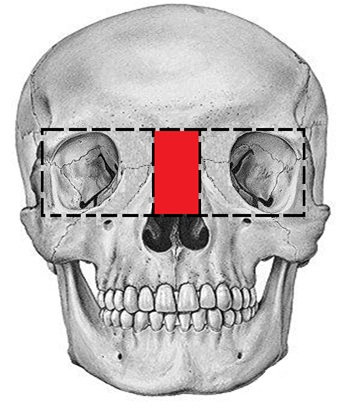
Box osteotomy for hypertelorism correction. Red box indicates the surgical site.

=== Craniofacial surgery ===
Craniofacial abnormalities can be corrected through surgical methods.

Affected individuals with severe hypertelorism may undergo orbital osteotomy. The two major osteotomy methods are box osteotomy and facial bipartition, which operate from different osteotomy sites but follow the same general procedures. During surgery, part of the bone, and sometimes excessive skin, are selectively removed from the central area of the nasofrontal region, such that this part of the skull can close in and correct hypertelorism. In addition, bone grafts are placed to provide support to the eyeballs and protect them from displacement.

Underdeveloped nasal alae can be corrected by orofacial reconstruction. This procedure recreates the nasal alae with the use of cartilage grafts, which are cartilage taken from the patient's ear, septum or rib. Afterwards, nasolabial flaps are placed to sustain the shape of the nose, specifically the alar groove.

=== Speech therapy ===
Patients who are affected by speech impairments can be treated by speech therapy.

Speech disability can be a manifestation of various physical or psychological causes. Symptomatic treatment of it is carried out after diagnostic tests such as video fluoroscopic barium study ("cookie swallow" test) or fiber-optic endoscopic evaluation. Despite the diversity in speech therapy techniques, most treatment plans follow the same progression:

1. Identification of defective features
2. Assistance with producing simple sounds; physical contact may be required to aid with motor speech disorders
3. Refrainment of assistance that allows patient to develop self-correction ability
4. Increase in length of syllables or speech
5. Self-evaluation of progress and provide explanation on the cause of improvements

For post-treatment monitoring, computer-based speech therapy that makes use of instructional software can provide computer-led practices as aftercare and quantify performances outside of conventional treatments.

== Epidemiology ==
Filippi syndrome is rare, with an estimated prevalence of less than one in a million. It has around thirty cases recorded in medical literature.

The number of affected males recorded is more than twice the number of affected females. However, this is insufficient to conclude that male are at a higher risk due to the small number of reported cases. However, the CDC says less than 25 cases have been reported, the National Organization for Rare Disorders says about 18 cases have been reported, while the National Center for Advancing Translational Sciences says 30 cases have been reported in literature.
