= Spondyloepimetaphyseal dysplasia-short limb-abnormal calcification syndrome =

- Other names: SMED-SL syndrome
- Specialty: Medical genetics, Pediatry
- Symptoms: Osseous anomalies which result primarily in short stature
- Complications: Death
- Usual onset: Birth
- Duration: Lifelong
- Causes: Genetic mutation
- Risk factors: Being of Puerto Rican descent, being part of a consanguineous family.
- Diagnostic method: This condition is diagnosed mainly through radiographs and sequencing of the DDR2 gene (gene responsible for the disorder).
- Differential diagnosis: Dwarfism, sudden infant death syndrome
- Prevention: None
- Treatment: treatment is done on the symptoms
- Prognosis: Poor
- Frequency: rare, only 24 cases have been described
- Deaths: 10

Spondyloepimetaphyseal dysplasia-short limb-abnormal calcification syndrome is a rare genetic disorder which is characterized by osseous anomalies resulting in short stature and other afflictions.

== Signs and symptoms ==
It consists of the following symptoms: disproportionately short stature, shortened upper and lower limbs, generalized shortening and broadening of the fingers alongside small hands, narrow chest, generalized rib anomalies, pectus excavatum, larynx, tracheal, and costal calcifications, frontal bossing, hypertelorism, eye prominence, flat and short nose, wide nostrils, high-arched palate, long philtrum, platyspondyly, and abnormalities of the epiphyses and metaphyses which can be observed on radiographs.

=== Complications ===
Recurrent bacterial infections and spinal compression associated with atlantoaxial instability can turn deadly if they remain untreated, resulting in premature death.

== Genetics ==
This condition is linked to autosomal recessive missense mutations in the DDR2 gene, in chromosome 1.

== Cases ==
According to OMIM, approximately 24 cases have been described in medical literature.

The following list comprises most (if not all) cases of spondyloepimetaphyseal dysplasia-short limb-abnormal calcification syndrome:

- 1993: Borochowitz et al. describes 3 patients with short stature, small upper and lower limbs, short nose with wide nasal bridge, broad nostrils, alongside facial dysmorphisms and other radiological anomalies. These individuals were born into Sephardic Jew (2 cases) and Puerto Rican families (1 case). In one of the Sephardic Jewish patients, both of their affected siblings died before reaching infancy.
- 1993: Langer et al. describes 8 patients with similar radiological findings, including anterior thorax and sternum deformities, abnormal premature calcification in cartilaginous structures, and facial dysmorphisms. 4 out of the 8 patients had died prematurely due to cord damage induced by antloaxial instability. 7 out of 8 patients came from Puerto Rican families. One patient suffered from calcification of the falx cerebri when they were nearly 2 years old (20 months old to be exact). One of the Puerto Rican families were consanguineous.
- 1996: Al-Gazali et al. describes 2 siblings born to consanguineous Egyptian parents, both children showed generalized calcification of the epiphyses, ligaments, and chondral tissues. Both siblings were intellectually normal. In a follow up from 2010, Ali et al. updated the case; both siblings died prematurely, one died at the age of 8 from cord compression and the other died at the age of 13 from respiratory complications.
- 2009: Bargal et al. describes 8 patients with the disorder. These cases confirmed that the bowing of lower limbs and global calcifications characteristic of this disorder were progressive.
- 2009: Smithson et al. describes a 7-year-old Pakistani child with a relatively mild form of the condition.
- 2009: Dias et al. describes 2 sisters with SMED-SL, both sisters had died prematurely, more specifically, in infancy. The cause of death was ruled to be foramen magnum stenosis-induced cord compression. Dysmorphic metacarpals and phalanges were also noted.

== History ==
This condition was first discovered in 1993, when they described 3 unrelated cases (from 3 separate families) coming from ethnic Sephardic Jewish (2 cases) and Puerto Rican (1 case) families, these patients had "severe short-limb bone dysplasia".
