= COG1 =

Protein-coding gene in the species Homo sapiens

Identifiers
- Aliases: COG1, CDG2G, LDLB, component of oligomeric golgi complex 1
- External IDs: OMIM: 606973; MGI: 1333873; GeneCards: COG1

Gene location (Human)
Chr.	Chromosome 17 (human)
Band	17q25.1	Start	73,193,055 bp
Band	17q25.1	End	73,208,507 bp

Gene location (Mouse)
Chr.	Chromosome 11 (mouse)
Band	11|11 E2	Start	113,539,995 bp
Band	11|11 E2	End	113,557,880 bp
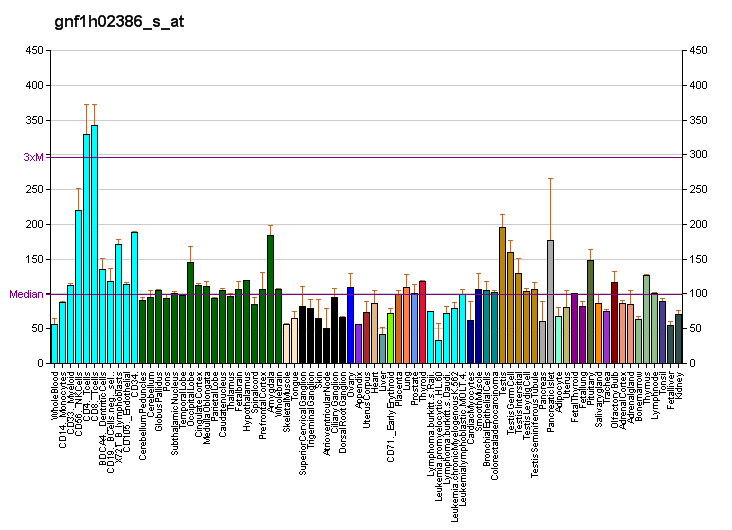
RNA expression pattern
Bgee	Human / Mouse (ortholog); Top expressed in: right hemisphere of cerebellum; apex of heart; right frontal lobe; anterior pituitary; Brodmann area 9; nucleus accumbens; prefrontal cortex; cingulate gyrus; anterior cingulate cortex; muscle of thigh / Top expressed in: external carotid artery; internal carotid artery; motor neuron; substantia nigra; islet of Langerhans; seminiferous tubule; Paneth cell; right ventricle; paraventricular nucleus of hypothalamus; submandibular gland; More reference expression data
BioGPS	More reference expression data
Gene ontology
Molecular function	protein binding
Cellular component	Golgi membrane; Golgi apparatus; membrane; trans-Golgi network membrane; Golgi transport complex
Biological process	protein transport; endoplasmic reticulum to Golgi vesicle-mediated transport; intra-Golgi vesicle-mediated transport; Golgi organization
Sources:Amigo / QuickGO
Orthologs
Databases	NCBI: entry; OMA: entry
Species	Human	Mouse
Entrez	9382	16834
Ensembl	ENSG00000166685	ENSMUSG00000018661
UniProt	Q8WTW3	Q9Z160
RefSeq (mRNA)	NM_018714	NM_013581
RefSeq (protein)	NP_061184	NP_038609
Location (UCSC)	Chr 17: 73.19 – 73.21 Mb	Chr 11: 113.54 – 113.56 Mb
PubMed search
- Wikidata
View/Edit Human	View/Edit Mouse

Conserved oligomeric Golgi complex subunit 1 is a protein that in humans is encoded by the COG1 gene.

The protein encoded by this gene is one of eight proteins (Cog1-8) which form a Golgi-localized complex (COG) required for normal Golgi morphology and function. It is thought that this protein is required for steps in the normal medial and trans-Golgi-associated processing of glycoconjugates and plays a role in the organization of the Golgi-localized complex.

== Interactions ==
COG1 has been shown to interact with COG4 and COG3.
