= Gievenbach =

River in Germany

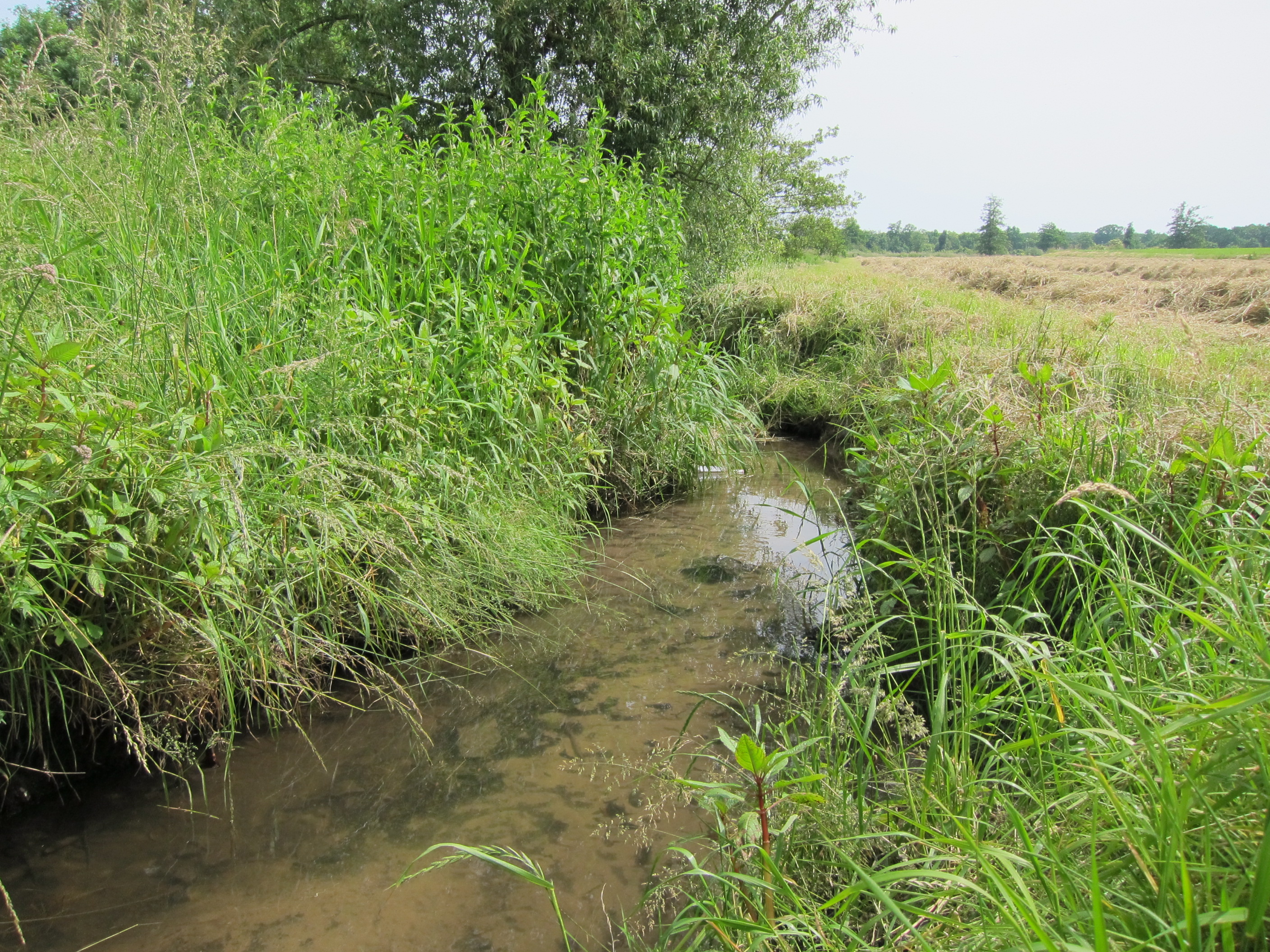

Location
- Country: Germany

Physical characteristics
- Source
  - location: Along the B54 highway, near the A1
  - coordinates: 51°59′25″N 7°32′54″E
- Mouth
  - location: Aasee, near the Allwetterzoo Münster
  - coordinates: 51°56′47″N 7°35′45″E
- Length: 6.4 km (4.0 mi)
- Basin size: 6.6 km^{2} (2.5 sq mi)

Basin features
- Progression: Münstersche Aa→ Ems→ North Sea

The Gievenbach is a small German stream in the Westphalian city of Münster. It runs entirely in the Gievenbeck district in the west of the city, which is named after the stream. The Gievenbach rises in the northwest of the district not far from the A1 motorway, flows southeastward through the district center, and ends in the Aasee, near the Münster Zoo.

== See also ==
- List of rivers of North Rhine-Westphalia
