= Nienberger Bach =

River in Germany

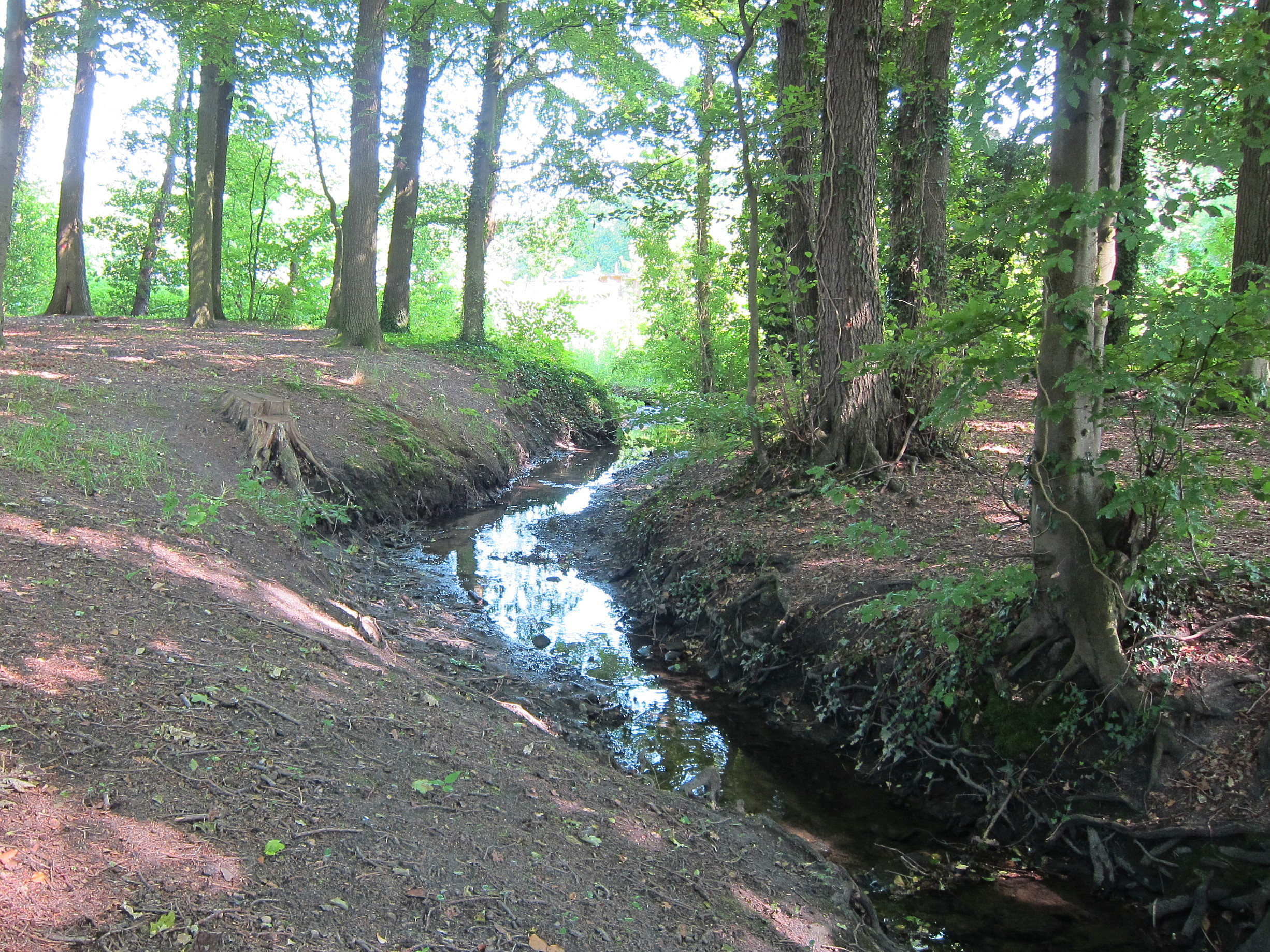

Location
- Country: Germany
- State: North Rhine-Westphalia

Physical characteristics
- Mouth
  - location: Kinderbach
  - coordinates: 52.0026°N 7.6144°E
- Length: 5.0 km (3.1 mi)

Basin features
- Progression: Kinderbach→ Münstersche Aa→ Ems→ North Sea

Nienberger Bach is a small river of North Rhine-Westphalia, Germany. It flows into the Kinderbach near Münster.

== See also ==
- List of rivers of North Rhine-Westphalia
