= Kinderbach =

Kinderbach may refer to:

- Kinderbach (Münstersche Aa), a river of North Rhine-Westphalia, Germany, tributary of the Münstersche Aa north of Münster
- Kinderbach (Kannenbach), a river of North Rhine-Westphalia, Germany, tributary of the Kannenbach southwest of Münster
