= Osnabrück Zoo =

Zoo Osnabrück

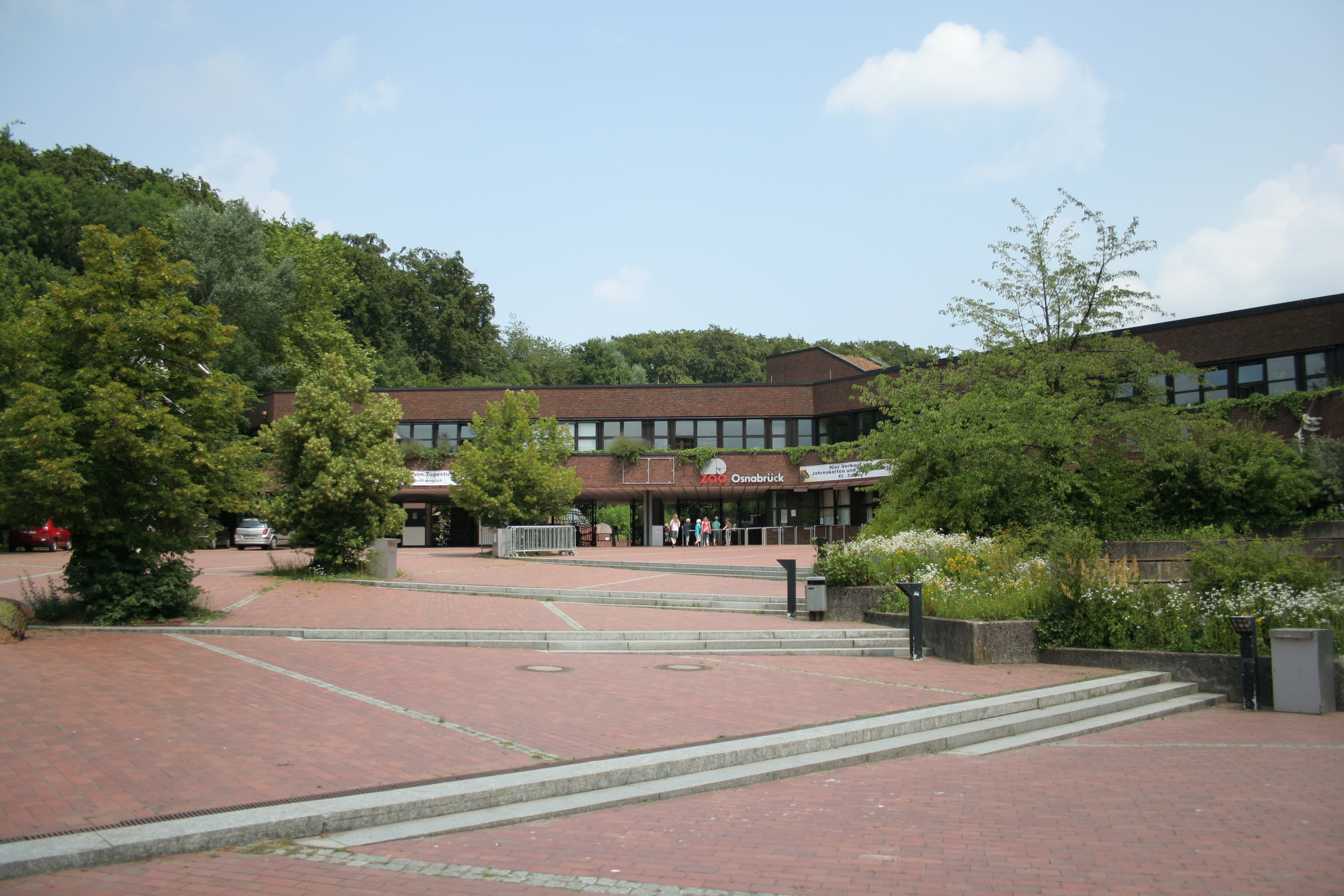
- Entrance
- Interactive map of Zoo Osnabrück
- 52°15′00″N 08°04′13″E
- Date opened: 26 July 1936
- Location: Klaus-Strick-Weg 12; 49082 Osnabrück
- Land area: 23.5 ha (0.235 km^{2})
- No. of animals: 2908(2012)
- No. of species: 290
- Annual visitors: Over 1.030.000 (2011)
- Owner: Zoo Osnabrück gGmbH
- Director: Michael Böer
- Management: Andreas Busemann
- Website: www.zoo-osnabrueck.de

Osnabrück Zoo, also known as Zoo Osnabrück, is a zoo located in south Osnabrück at the hillside of Schölerberg in Osnabrück, Germany. It was founded under the name "Heimattiergarten", and opened during the summer of 1936. Almost 3000 animals from roughly 300 species can be seen on the 23.5 ha (0.235 km^{2}) land. It is famous for housing the Grolar Bear. This brought about many scientific inquiries into the zoo.

== History ==
The Osnabrück Zoo was founded as a home zoo in July 1935 and opened on July 26, 1936.

Zoo friends had come together in the "Community of Friends of the Home Zoo". The plan to found a zoo in Osnabrück was put into practice with the help of donations. The first animals were a badger, a fox and a bear. An aviary, an owl tower, a deer and roe deer gate and an aquarium followed a little later. In 1938 the first bears arrived in the still small zoological garden.

In April 1945, as a result of the Second World War, the number of animals in the home zoo was very low, the zoo was badly damaged and in debt. The ambitions were still great after the war, so the “Heimattiergarten” was renamed “Tiergarten” in 1947 and the first monkeys moved in. In 1959 and 1960 a warm house, a penguin enclosure and the first elephant house were built. On April 17, 1961, the first Indian elephant cow Toni, bought by the William Althoff circus, moved in. A week later the cow Targa joined them. In 1968 the antelope enclosure was opened. In 1970 the Tiergarten Osnabrück was renamed Zoo Osnabrück. The sea lion enclosure was built in 1973 and the South America area was opened in 1975, funded by the Wilhelm Karmann Foundation. A multi-purpose warm house, which opened in May 1975, burned down on the night of January 3 to 4, 1978 due to chewed electrical lines, killing dozen animals and causing property damage of around two million Deutsche Marks.

From 1980 onwards, there were a number of new buildings, renovations and extensions with the focus on animal welfare and the aim of developing the zoo into a nature adventure park with individual themed landscapes. In 1986 the new entrance area with the administration and the attached natural history Museum am Schölerberg was opened. In 1988 and 1989 a tropical hall, the aquarium, a new penguin enclosure and an expanded outdoor enclosure for the great apes were built. The new elephant park was completed in 1998. From March 22 to April 4, 2001, the Osnabrück Zoo, like the neighboring zoos in Münster and Rheine, closed due to the foot-and-mouth disease that broke out in the neighboring Netherlands. The measure was intended to protect the animal population from the epidemic and prevent further spread.

In 2004, the opening of the Samburu landscape took place. Giraffes live here with zebras, ostriches and other African animals. In September 2006, Suma, a female orangutan, who over time had become a favorite of the zoo's public, died. In 2007, the elephant and rhinoceros enclosure were combined into one landscape, the Valley of the Grey Giants. In March 2009, the Osnabrück Zoo was expanded to include a unique underground zoo. In June 2010, the 5.5 hectare Takamanda African area opened, for which the zoo grounds were expanded to the south (Autobahn 30). The cost of this project was ten million euros. In July 2011, the new taiga landscape Kajanaland was opened. The investment costs amounted to 2.9 million euros.

For the 75th anniversary of the zoo, the Prime Minister of Lower Saxony, David McAllister, opened the exhibition of the United Buddy Bears - The Minis, together with Mayor Boris Pistorius and Zoo President Reinhard Coppenrath; a "Campaign for Peace and Tolerance" that generated donations of 120,000 euros that will benefit the zoo and children's facilities. In May 2012, a new facility for Southern pig-tailed macaques was opened. A temple based on the model of Angkor Wat was built in the center of the zoo. The opening of the interactive climate exhibition Klimatopia with the climate ambassadors and mascots Tips and Taps, two hybrid bears born in the Osnabrück Zoo, took place on April 11, 2013. The new tiger enclosure was opened in April 2014. Like the pig monkey enclosure that opened in 2012, it is designed in the style of an Asian temple complex. In September 2017, the inauguration of the third section of the Angkor Wat area took place with the renovation and expansion of the ape house and the enclosure of the popular orangutan "Buschi". The “Wir für Buschi” fundraising campaign alone contributed a third of the costs, amounting to 1.5 million euros.

In the Northeast of the zoo, the North American landscape of Manitoba was opened in October 2018. In September 2017, the first wood bison moved into their 3800 square meter outdoor area. The rhinoceros and lion enclosures will probably be rebuilt by the end of 2020 and combined to form a common themed area, Mapungubwe. Following this, the new Water Worlds theme area for sea lions, seals and penguins is to be built by 2022. After that, the elephant enclosure will be renewed, which would have renewed all of the zoo's large enclosures since 2004. The groundbreaking ceremony for the Water Worlds took place in May 2021, and completion is scheduled for mid-2022. The construction of the facility was secured by additional funding from the State of Lower Saxony in the amount of around 800,000 euros after the zoo had to struggle with financial losses due to the COVID-19 pandemic.

=== Incident in March 2017 ===
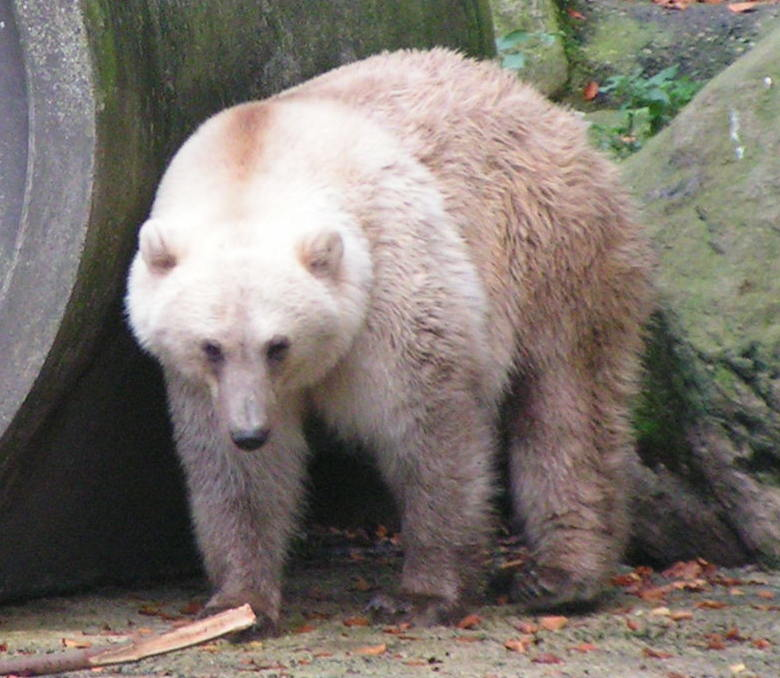
Hybrid bear "Tips" in 2006

On March 11, 2017, at around 2:15 p.m., the hybrid bear Tips escaped from her enclosure in the Kajanaland area, where she had lived with her brother Taps. Visitors alerted zoo staff after seeing the bear moving toward the entrance. Around 4,000 visitors were at the zoo at the time and were warned by announcements and brought to safety inside animal houses. During her escape, Tips knocked over an employee, who sustained minor injuries. When the bear subsequently threatened zoo employees, she was shot. Zoo director Michael Böer explained that a tranquilizer would have taken 10 to 20 minutes to take effect.

Taps remained in the enclosure and was placed in his stall until the investigation was completed. The zoo subsequently reopened, with the area around the bear enclosure remaining closed.

The subsequent investigation found that Tips had overcome an electric fence before escaping through the adjacent silver fox enclosure and then breaking through its outer fencing. The zoo subsequently reviewed the security of its animal enclosures and visitor facilities. In November 2017, the zoo made Tips' preserved body available to the State Museum of Natural History in Stuttgart, where researchers prepared the animal for scientific study of hybridization between polar and brown bears.

== Areas ==
=== Subterranean Zoo ===
In an underground tunnel, visitors can observe earth dwellers such as naked mole rats, black tailed prairie dogs, lesser hedgehog tenreks, coruros, rats, tarantulas and Mechow's mole-rats. On around 500 m^{2}, visitors have special insights into the animal structures. The construction costs of the underground zoo amounted to around 1.2 million euros. In 2017, an area originally conceived as an exhibition space was converted into a bat grotto. It houses Pallas's long-tongued bats (Glossophaga soricina), from the leaf-nose family.

=== Samburu (Africa) ===
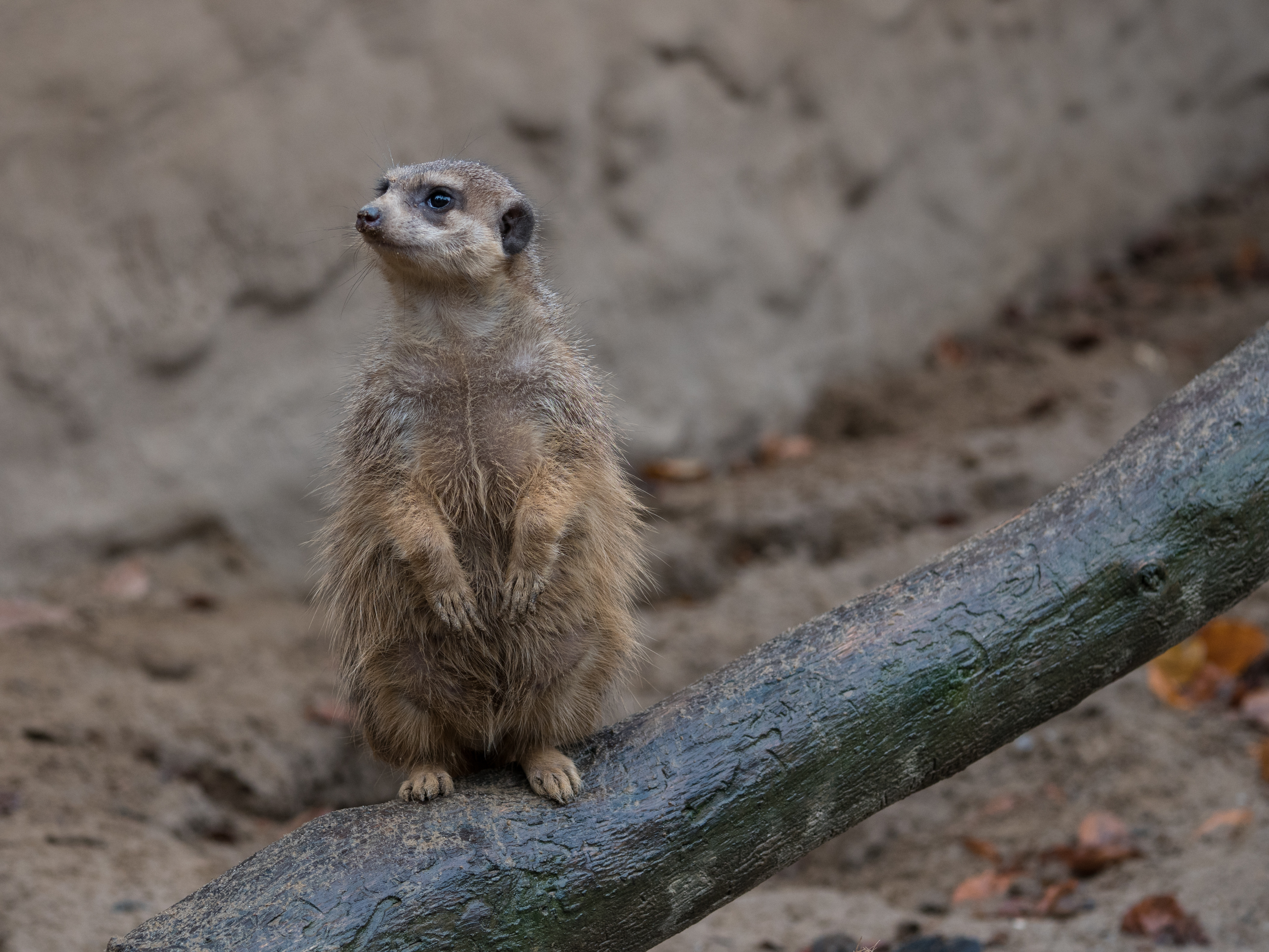
Meerkat in the Samburu area

In Samburu, giraffes, ostriches, greater kudus, waterbucks, rock hyraxes, bush hyraxes, demoiselle cranes, village weavers, greater flamingos, meerkats, lions and impalas are found on around two hectares. In the safari camp you can dine and watch the animals at the same time. The facility is named after the Samburu National Reserve, a national park in northern Kenya.

=== Takamanda (Africa) ===
The African area "Takamanda" is home to bongos, Chapman's zebras, donkeys, goats, drills, red river hogs, African forest buffalos, chimpanzees, servals, spotted hyenas, waterbucks, blue wildebeests, hartebeests, warthogs, turacos, hamerkops, white-headed buffalo weavers, glossy starlings, the endangered Diana monkey and banded mongooses. A total of 80 animals live on the 5.5 hectare area, which is modeled on a savannah landscape and named after a national park in Cameroon. There is also a tree house village "Makatanda" in this themed landscape, with a playground and petting zoo.

=== Manitoba (North America) ===
The 3.5-hectare (8.6-acre) area named after the Canadian province of Manitoba opened on October 5, 2018. The renovation work for the North American landscape amounted to a total of 3.5 million euros. The first wood bisons (Bison bison athabascae), Hudson Bay wolves (Canis lupus hudsonicus) and black bears (Ursus americanus) moved into the first section in 2017. In the meantime, various small mammals such as New World porcupines, marmots, Arctic foxes and skunks, but also turkeys, great grey owls and snowy owls populate the area. A beaver castle gives an insight into the life of the Canadian beaver.

=== South American area ===
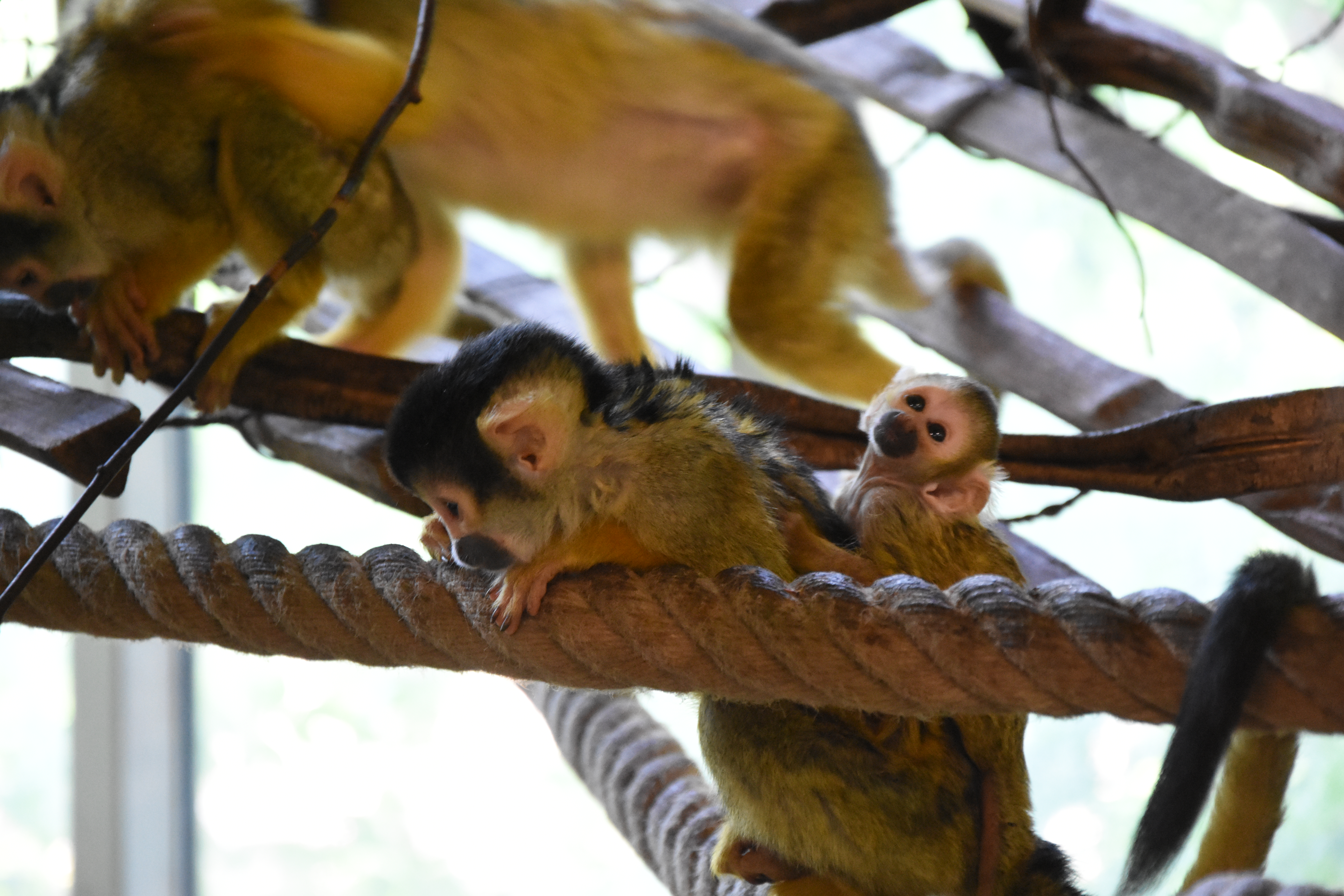
Squirrel monkeys with cub in the South American area

In addition to the outdoor enclosures for tapirs, maned wolves as well as vicuñas and rheas, there is a South American house with South American coatis, capybaras, sloths, boa constrictors, tamarins, squirrel monkeys, capuchin monkeys and the so-called “Mendoza hall” (formerly “tropical hall”), in the flora and fauna of a northern Argentinean plateau are modeled on the province of Mendoza.

=== Angkor Wat (Asia) ===
The Asian temple landscape, based on the model of Angkor Wat, consists of a walk-in "monkey temple" with southern pig-tailed macaques, tiger, tufted deer and red panda enclosures and an hominid house with siamangs, Northern white-cheeked gibbons and orangutans. The painting orangutan "Buschi", a public favorite of the zoo, also lives here. The income from the sold works goes into the tapir protection project "Tajya-Saruta", which the Osnabrück Zoo has been supporting since 2003.

=== Tetra Aquarium & Terrarium ===
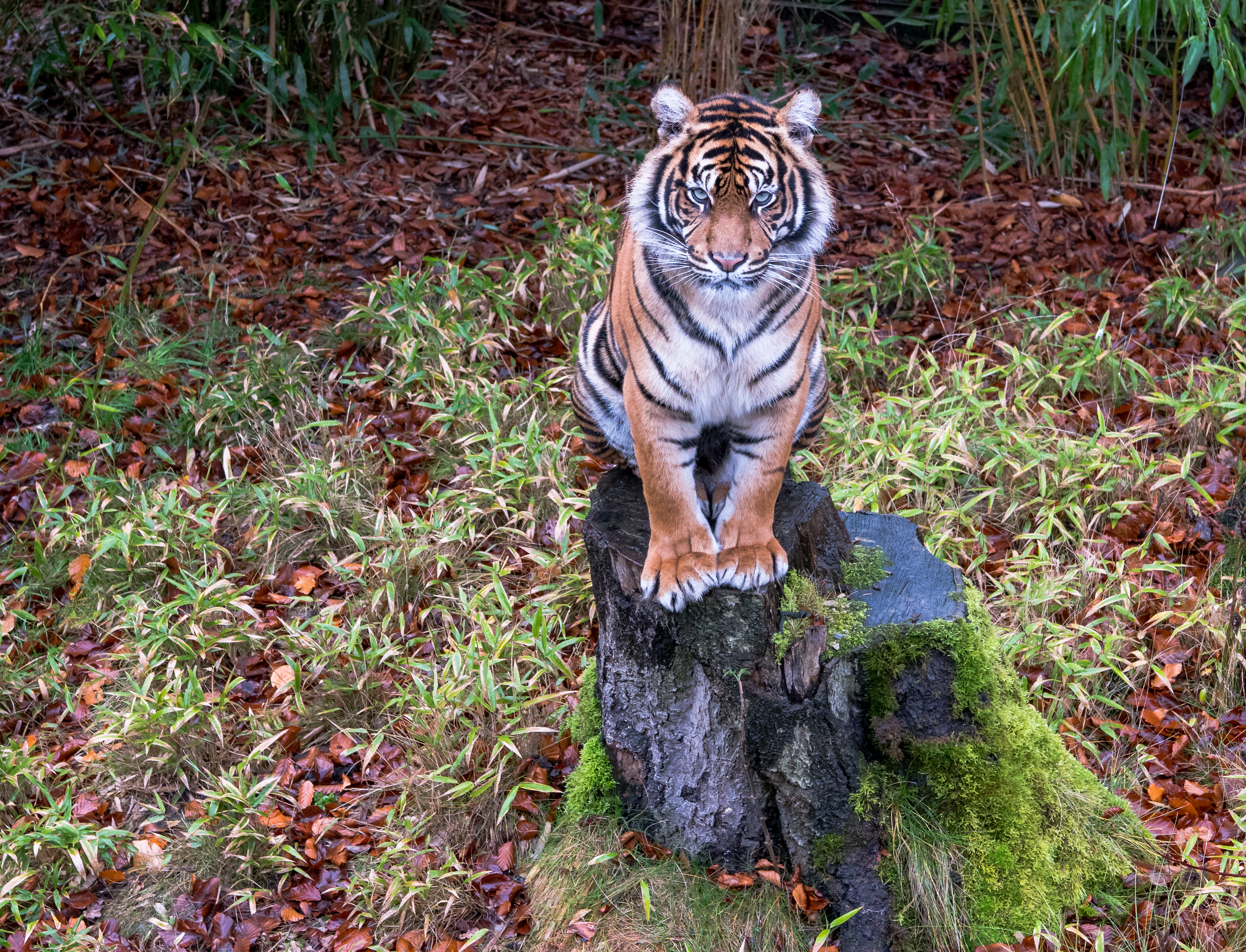
Sumatran tiger in the Angkor Wat area

With the help of Tetra GmbH, an aquarium house was built which houses a wide variety of aquatic animals. The aquarium has a freshwater and a saltwater area as well as a fish petting pool. There are also several terrariums with snakes, giant tortoises and spectacled caimans. As a special feature, you can watch leaf cutter ants transporting cut plant leaves from their feeding place through transparent tubes into their burrow. In the terrarium there is a warm, humid rainforest climate with 70% humidity and a temperature of around 30 °C. An artificial thunderstorm is created three times a day in the caiman facility.

=== Water Worlds ===
Between the restaurant and the Valley of the Grey Giants, Humboldt penguins and harbor seals can be seen. Using a small passage, visitors can easily get to both enclosures and may see the breeding caves of the penguins. Between Kajanaland and the South American area, California sea lions swim their rounds.

=== Valley of the Grey Giants ===
In addition to elephants, rhinos, porcupines and blue cranes, there are also rarely shown animals such as the sand cat, lesser kudu, bat-eared fox and the round-eared elephant shrew living in the Valley of the Grey Giants.

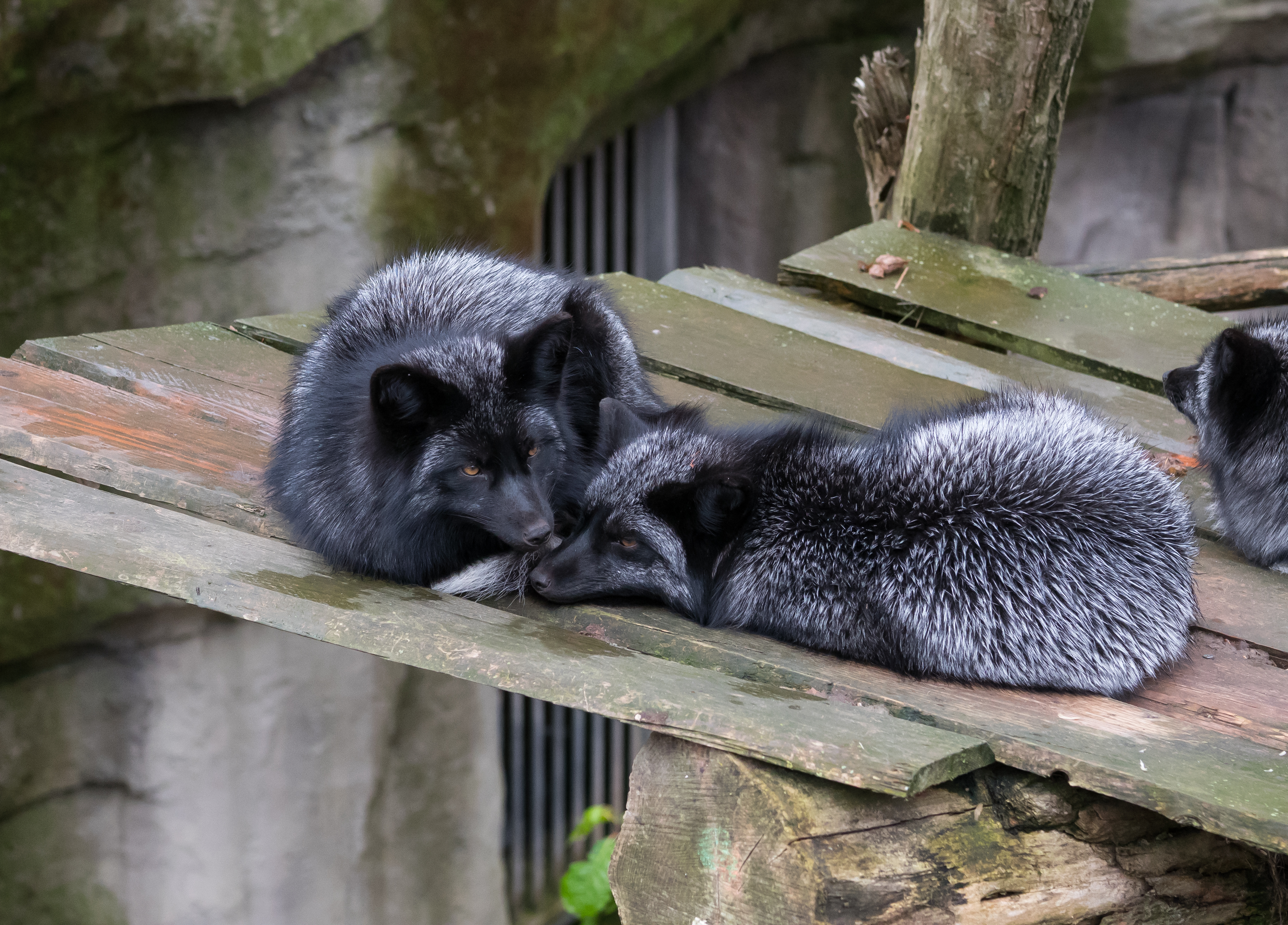
Silver foxes in the Kajanaland area

=== Kajanaland (Northern Europe) ===
Kajanaland is modeled on the northern European taiga landscape. hybrid bears, lynx, wolverines, raccoons, reindeer, silver foxes and Gute sheep live here. Some of the enclosures can be viewed from above via a tree-height path from a height of up to six meters. This guided tour is so far unique in German zoos.

A replica of a megalithic grave has been located on the western edge of the zoo since the 1980s. For the replica, stones from one of the large stone graves near Nahne were moved to the zoo. However, since 2011, when the area was redesigned to today's Kajanaland and the route was changed, the grave has no longer been directly accessible to visitors.

== Reception ==
In the rankings of European zoos by British zoo expert Anthony Sheridan, Osnabrück Zoo reached the top places in the group several times with 500,000 to 1 million visitors annually. The zoo was in second place in the 2011 and 2013 rankings and in 2015 was tied with the Münster Allwetterzoo in third place.

In a customer survey conducted by Service Value GmbH in 2012, in which visitors from 20 German zoos were asked about the service they experienced, Osnabrück Zoo took first place.
