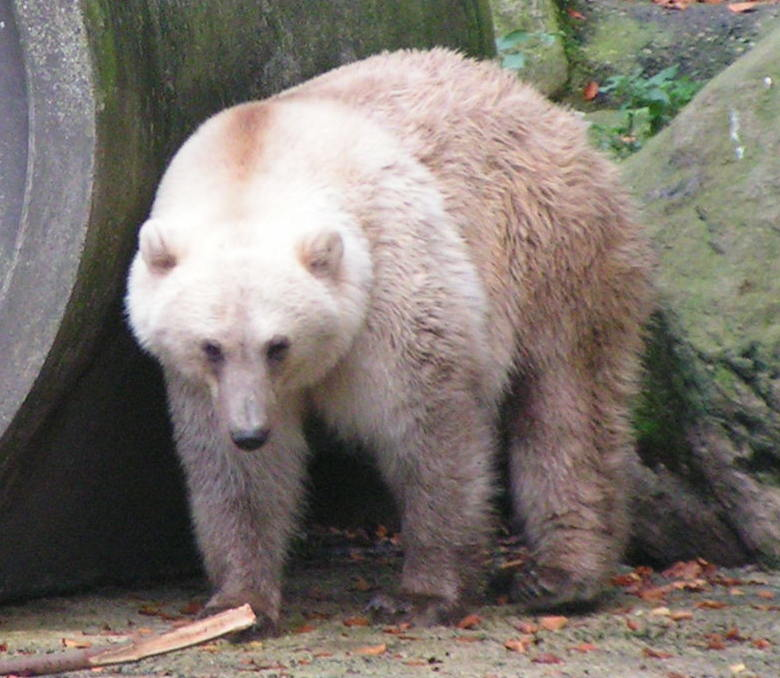
- Polar/brown bear hybrid at Osnabrück Zoo

Scientific classification
- Kingdom: Animalia
- Phylum: Chordata
- Class: Mammalia
- Order: Carnivora
- Family: Ursidae
- Tribe: Ursini
- Genus: Ursus
- Species: U. maritimus × U. arctos

= Grizzly–polar bear hybrid =

Cross between grizzly and polar bear

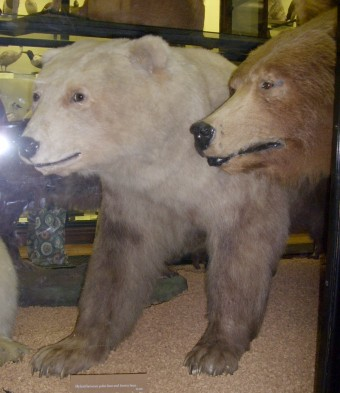
Polar/brown bear hybrid taxidermy specimen on display at Natural History Museum at Tring in Hertfordshire, England

A grizzly–polar-bear hybrid (also named grolar bear, pizzly bear, zebra bear, grizzlar, or nanulak) is a rare ursid hybrid that has occurred both in captivity and in the wild. In 2006, the occurrence of this hybrid in nature was confirmed by testing the DNA of a unique-looking bear who had been shot near Sachs Harbour, Northwest Territories, on Banks Island in the Canadian Arctic. The number of confirmed hybrids has since risen to eight, all of them descending from the same female polar bear.

Possible wild-bred polar bear–grizzly bear hybrids have been reported and shot in the past, but DNA tests were not available to verify the bears' ancestry.

Genetic analysis has revealed multiple instances of introgressive hybridization between bear species, including introgression of polar bear DNA into brown bears during the Pleistocene ("grizzly bear" is a local common name for Ursus arctos whereas "brown bear" is used internationally and in science to refer to the species as a whole).

== Occurrences in the wild ==
With several suspected sightings and eight confirmed cases, theories of how such hybrids might naturally occur have become more than hypothetical. Although these sister species often occupy adjacent regions, direct contact has not been the norm because polar bears hunt, breed, and sometimes even make maternity dens on sea ice, whereas brown bears have an overwhelmingly terrestrial lifestyle.

Scientists have been unable to give an exact explanation for the phenomenon. One theory suggests that as the grizzly population increases, male bears leave their dens sooner while females stay with their cubs. This means that to the male grizzlies, female polar bears have become viable mates. This is the main speculated reason for the fact that hybrids have been reported to have grizzly fathers and polar mothers. Scientists have also hypothesized this may also be a climate change issue. As winters begin to get shorter, grizzlies begin to move more frequently, expanding their territory. This expansion in territory has also changed what these grizzlies are eating. With the lack of berries, salmon, and natural vegetation in the Arctic, grizzlies have been seen hunting seals, which are a common prey for polar bears. This close proximity while hunting is another proposed explanation for the hybridization.

=== 2006 discovery ===
Jim Martell, a hunter from Idaho, reportedly shot a grizzly–polar bear hybrid near Sachs Harbour on Banks Island, Northwest Territories on April 16, 2006. Martell, with his local guide, Roger Kuptana, had been hunting for polar bears, and killed the animal, believing it to be a normal polar bear. Officials took interest in the creature after noticing that while it had thick, creamy white fur typical of polar bears, it also had long claws, a humped back, a shallow face, and brown patches around its eyes, nose, back, and foot, which are all traits of grizzly bears. If the bear had been adjudicated to be a grizzly, the hunter would have faced a possible CAN$1,000 fine and up to a year in jail.

A DNA test conducted by Wildlife Genetics International in British Columbia confirmed it was a hybrid, with a polar bear mother and a grizzly bear father. It is the first documented case in the wild, though it was known that this hybrid was biologically possible and other ursid hybrids had been bred in zoos in the past.

On May 8, 2006, the discovery of the grizzly–polar bear hybrid received increased attention when, soon after the story was announced, the comedy television show The Colbert Report light-heartedly named the new species as the number one threat to American Security.

Amidst much controversy, the bear has since been returned to Martell.

=== Subsequent discoveries ===
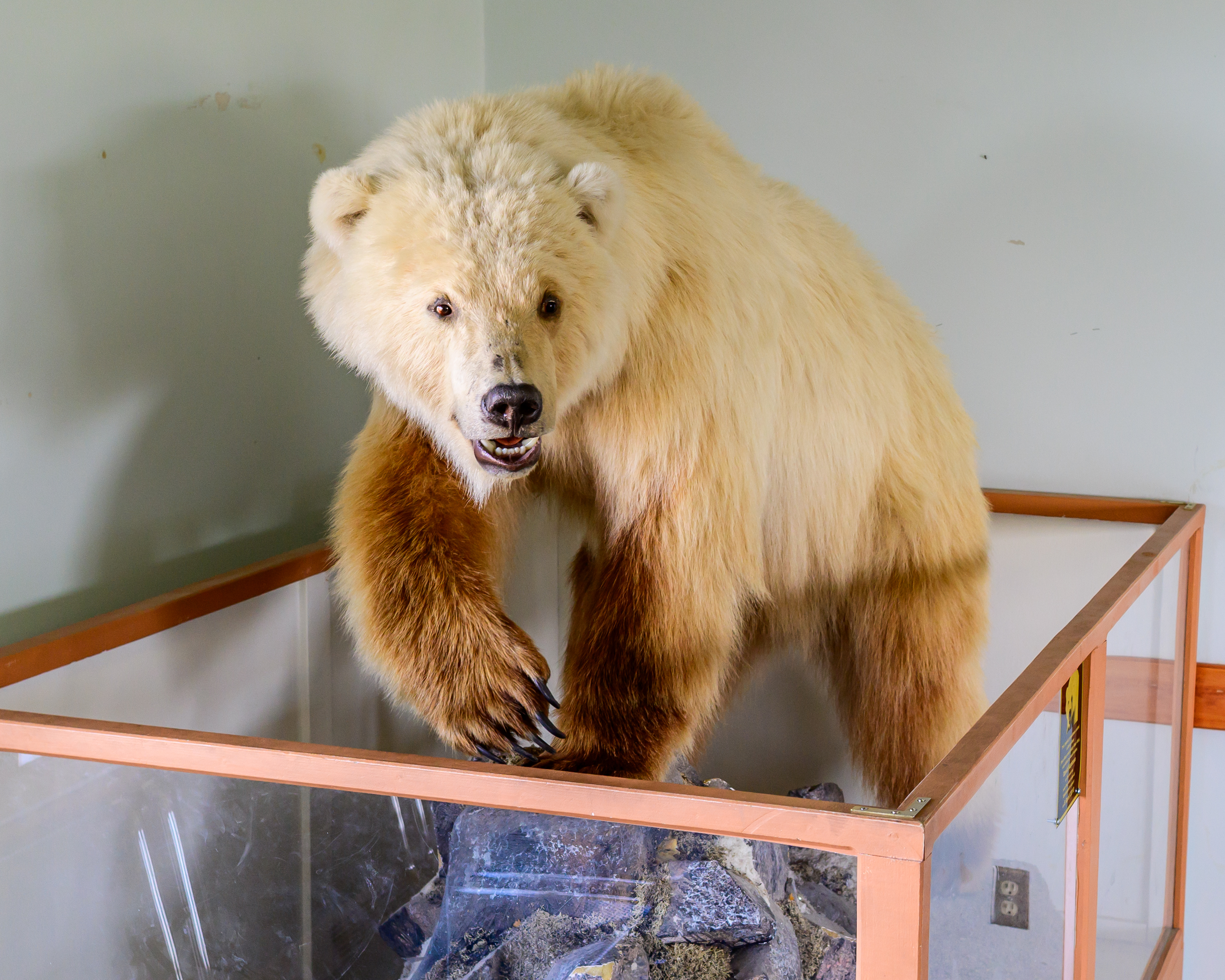
The Ulukhaktok bear

On April 8, 2010, David Kuptana, an Inuvialuk hunter from the community of Ulukhaktok on Victoria Island, shot what he thought was a polar bear. After inspecting the bear and having its DNA tested, it was discovered that the bear's mother was a grizzly–polar hybrid and the father was a grizzly bear. The bear possesses physical characteristics intermediate between grizzlies and polar bears, such as brown fur on its paws, long claws, and a grizzly-like head.

Between 2012 and 2014, another six hybrid bears were either killed by hunters or live-captured by biologists. Samples were collected from all six, and genetic analysis confirmed both their hybrid status and their family relationships. The eight hybrids identified to date include four first-generation (F1, 50:50) and four grizzly bear backcross individuals (75:25 grizzly:polar bear). A single F1 female was the mother of all four backcross individuals, and a single female polar bear was the mother of all four F1s, and thus the grandmother of all four backcross bears. Two male grizzlies mated with the female polar bear to give rise to the four F1s, with one grizzly bear apparently mating with the polar bear in two different years (two of the F1s are full siblings, but born three years apart). The same two male brown bears both mated with the F1 female to produce the four backcross individuals, with three littermates being sired by one male and a single, older 3/4 grizzly bear coming from a mating between the F1 female and her father.

=== Arviat bear ===
It was widely reported that a bear shot in 2016, near Arviat on the western shore of Hudson Bay, was a hybrid, with news agencies stating that this was an outcome of climate change. This bear was light in colour, but 'blonde' grizzly bears are common on the Barren Grounds, and the Arviat bear did not have other features characteristic of hybrids. The Arviat bear was subsequently confirmed by genetic analysis to be a pure brown bear.

== Range expansion of brown bears as a possible contributing factor ==
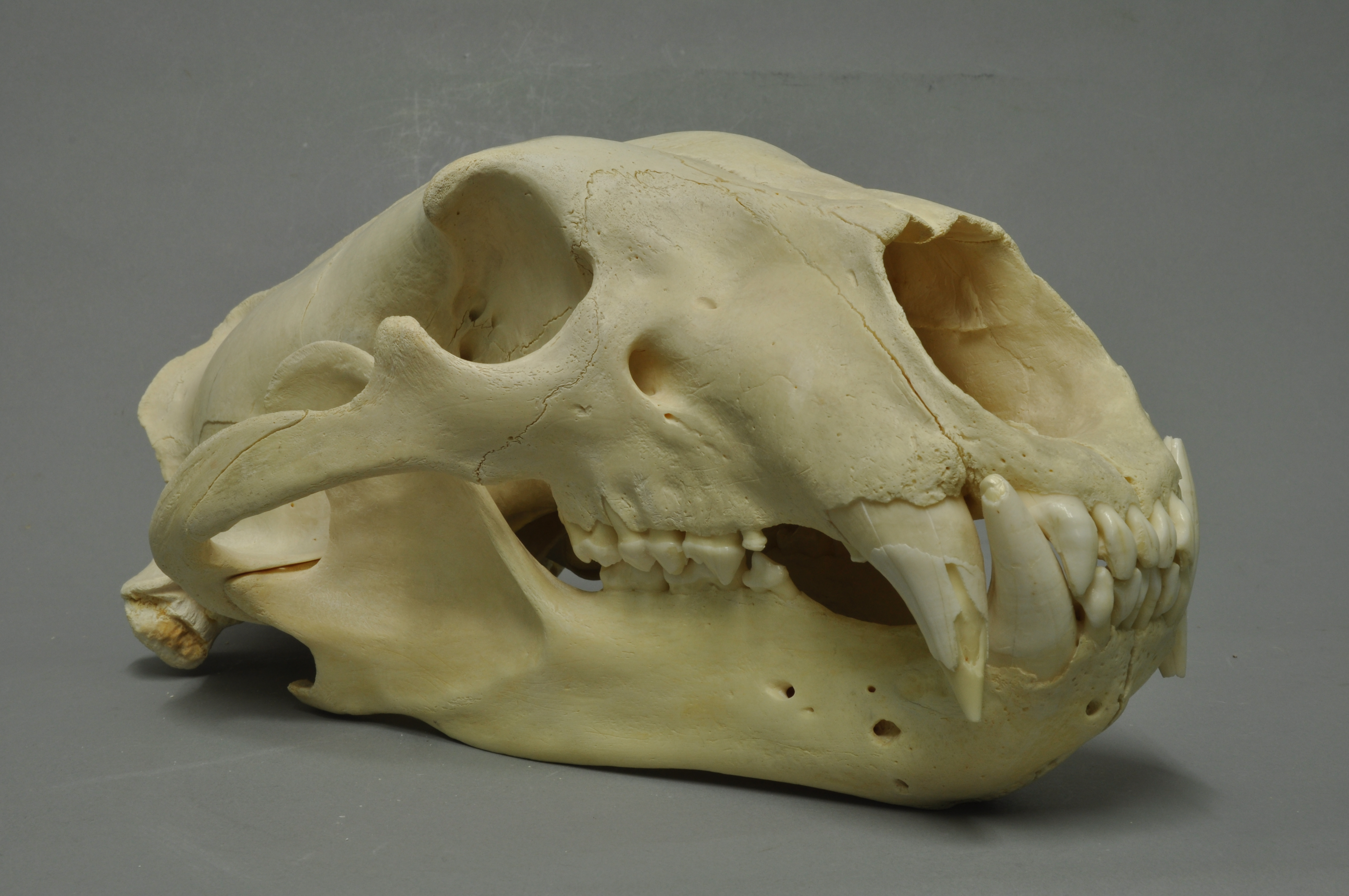
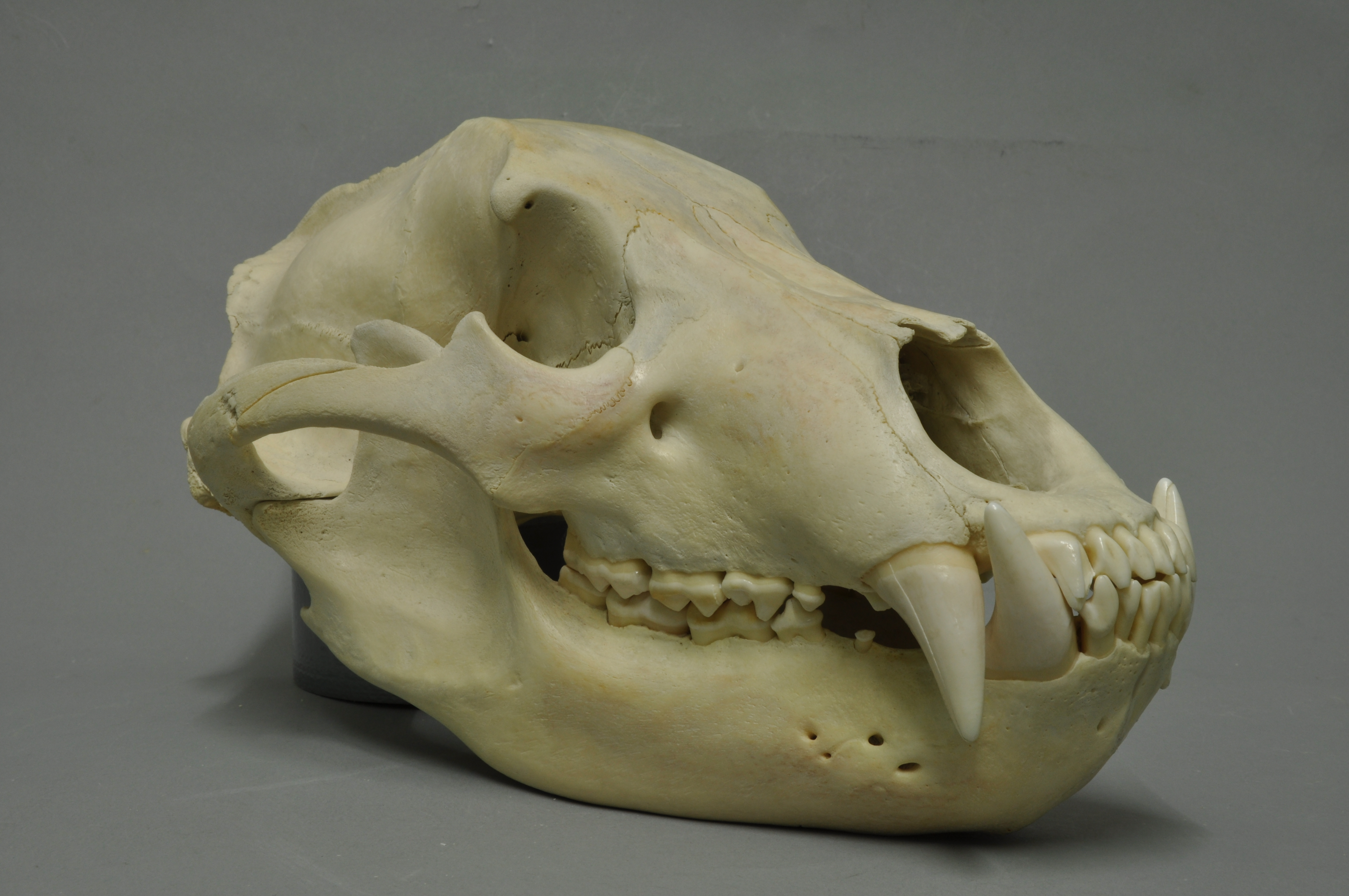
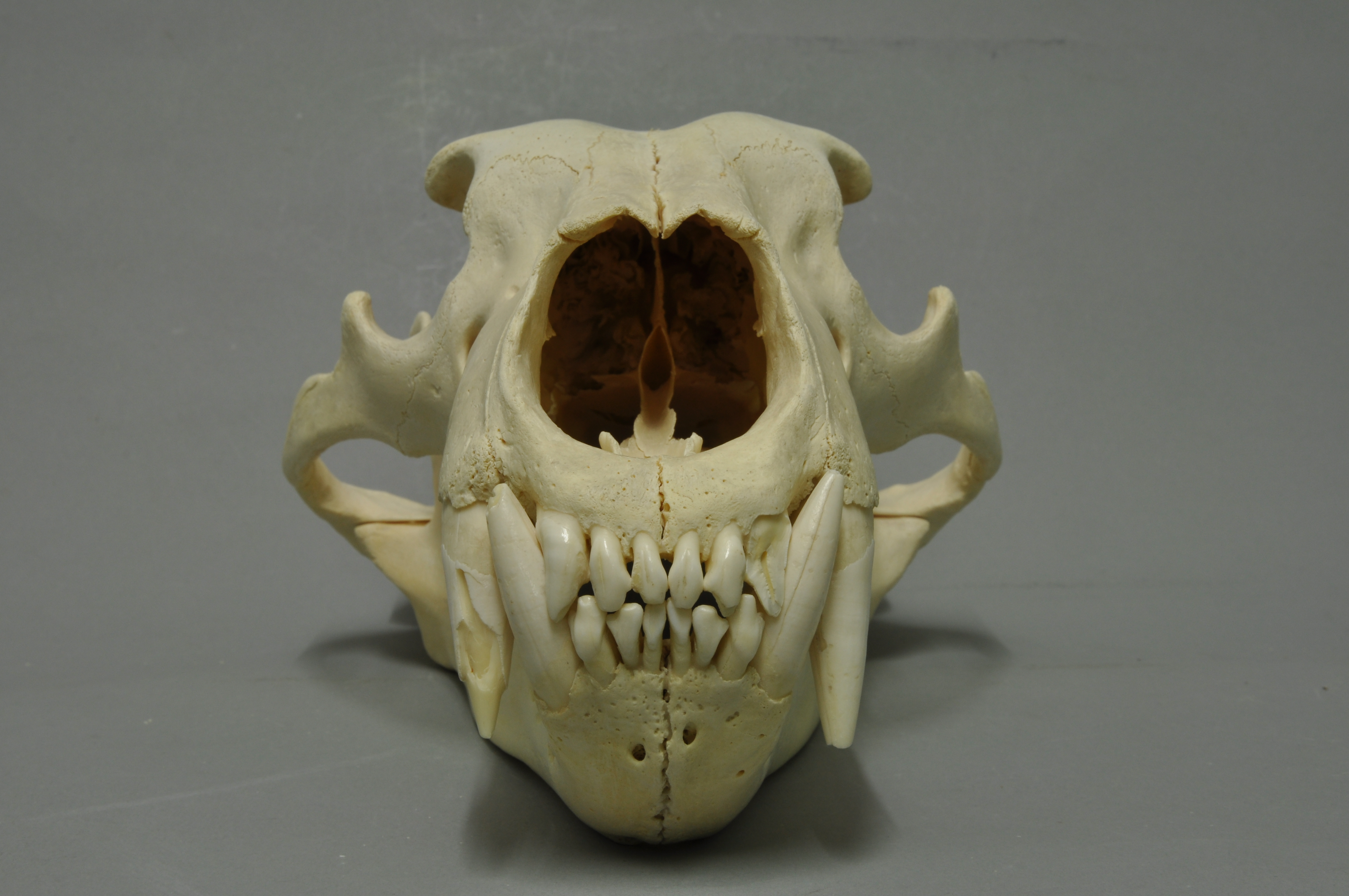
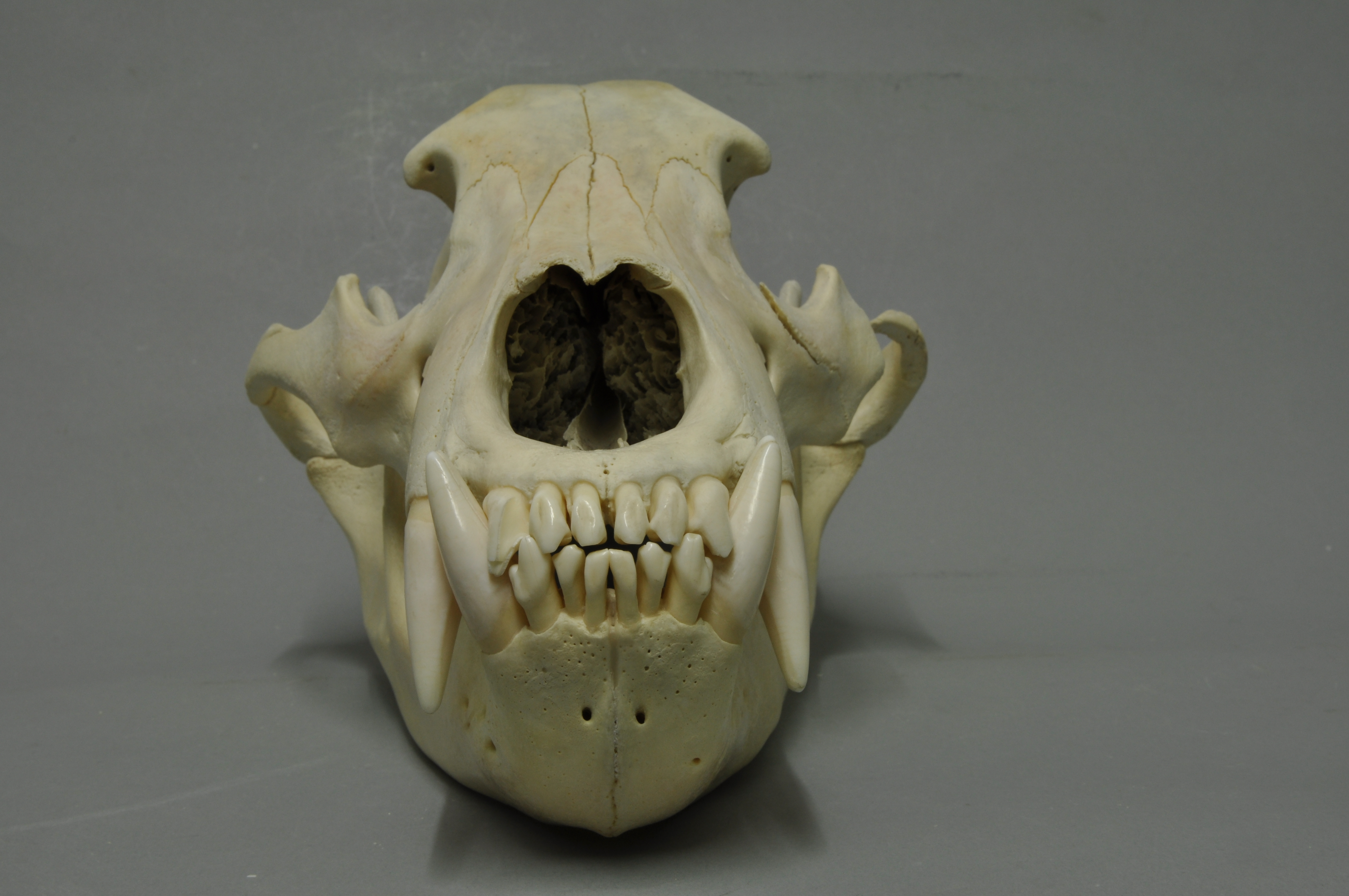
Skulls: polar bear (left), brown bear (right)

It is currently unknown why grizzly bears are being found in the habitat of polar bears. Although a grizzly bear was killed on Banks Island in 1951, it has, until recently, been rare for this species to stray far north of the coast of mainland Canada. In 1991, one or more grizzly bears were documented hunting seals and polar bears on the sea ice near Melville island, over 500 km from the mainland coast. In 2003 and 2004, a geological team working on Melville Island obtained photographic and DNA evidence of a grizzly bear in the area. Their report also collated information on several other sightings in the Canadian Arctic Archipelago.

Grizzly bears have apparently also been extending their range east across the Barren Grounds towards Hudson Bay, and south towards northern Saskatchewan and Manitoba. Between 2003 and 2008, seven individuals were spotted in Wapusk National Park south of Churchill, Manitoba, an area used by polar bears for maternity dens and as a refuge during the ice-free season on Hudson Bay.

== Ancient hybridization ==
The genetic methods used to confirm the family relationships and ancestry of the hybrid bears from northern Canada date back to the early 1990s, and are not powerful enough to reveal ancient history. However, the newer methods of genomics analyze thousands of sites in the genome, allowing the history of individual fragments of chromosomes to be traced back to particular populations (or species in the case of hybridization). Genomic studies of brown bears and polar bears have revealed that gene flow from polar bears into brown bears, but not the other way around, was widespread in time and space during the Pleistocene. Of particular note, the bears living on the islands of the Alexander Archipelago of southeast Alaska trace their maternally inherited mitochondrial DNA entirely to polar bears, but over 90% of their nuclear genome to brown bears. This appears to reflect a process in which a population of polar bears was left behind as the species retreated northwards at the end of the last ice age, with male brown bears subsequently introducing genes from the adjacent mainland, but female brown bears being generally unable or unwilling to swim across several kilometres of open ocean to reach the islands (thus the lack of exchange of mitochondrial DNA).

Such studies have not been limited to polar bears and brown bears, and it now appears that gene flow between species has been widespread during the evolution of the living species of bears.

== Naming ==
Possible hybridisation between different species of bear

Since the 2006 discovery placed the hybrid into the spotlight, the media have referred to this animal with several portmanteau names, such as pizzly bear, grolar bear, and polizzly, but there is no consensus on the use of any one of these terms. Canadian wildlife officials have suggested calling the hybrid "nanulak", taken from the Inuit names for polar bear (nanuk) and grizzly bear (aklak).

By one convention, the name of the sire comes first in such combinations: the offspring of a male polar bear and a female grizzly would be the suggested nanulak or a "pizzly bear", while the offspring of a male grizzly and a female polar bear would be a "grolar bear" or possibly an aknuk.

== Captive hybrids ==
Two grizzly–polar hybrid cubs (one female and one male) were born at Osnabrück Zoo in Osnabrück in 2004, and their physical traits are generally intermediate between the polar bear and the grizzly bear. For example, their bodies are smaller than polar bears, but larger than grizzlies, while their heads fall between the broader grizzly head and the leaner polar bear head. They have long necks like polar bears, but small shoulder humps like grizzlies. The soles of their feet are partially covered in hair; polar bears have hair-covered soles, which act as insulation, and grizzlies have hairless soles.

Similarly, the hair of the hybrids exhibits a pattern of hollowness, which blends the traits of polar bears and grizzlies. In cross-section, the hair of polar bears is hollow, while the hair of grizzlies is either solid or has small hollow regions. This varies according to which part of the grizzly the hair is taken from. In the hybrid male, the paw hair was solid, but the dark back hair was somewhat hollow, albeit with "smaller empty regions than found in polar bear hair". The hair of the female hybrid, "contains a range of hollow regions".

The hybrids demonstrated behavior more similar to polar bears than grizzlies. They stomped toys in a manner reminiscent of how polar bears break the ice, and hurled bags to the side "as polar bears may hurl prey". Grizzlies given the same bags do not demonstrate this hurling behavior. The hybrids were also observed lying down as polar bears do: on their bellies with rear legs splayed.

The female hybrid bear, Tips, escaped her enclosure in November 2017, and was subsequently shot dead; zoo director Michael Boes reasoned that a tranquilizer would have taken 20 minutes to take effect, adding that "Tips' death was a great loss".
