= Kinderbach (Kannenbach) =

River in Germany

Location
- Country: Germany
- States: North Rhine-Westphalia

Physical characteristics
- Mouth
  - location: Kannenbach
  - coordinates: 51.8879°N 7.5583°E

Basin features
- Progression: Kannenbach→ Dortmund–Ems Canal→ Ems→ North Sea

Kinderbach is a small river of North Rhine-Westphalia, Germany. It is 4.1 km long and flows into the Kannenbach as a right tributary southwest of Münster.

== See also ==
- List of rivers of North Rhine-Westphalia
