= Aasee (Münster) =

Lake in North Rhine-Westphalia, Germany

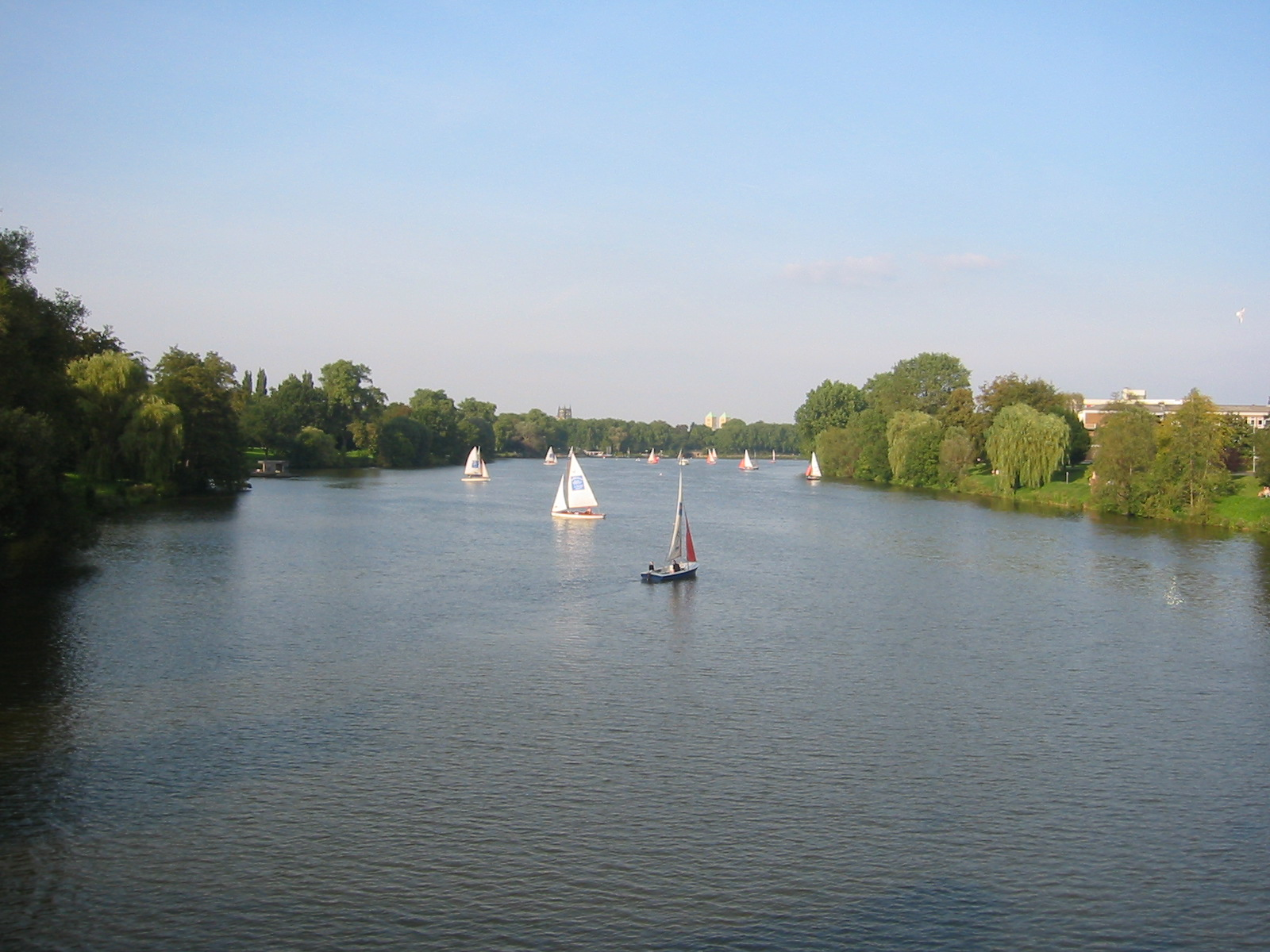

- Location within Germany
- Location: Münster, North Rhine-Westphalia
- Coordinates: 51°56′58″N 7°36′12.65″E
- Type: artificial lake
- Primary inflows: Münstersche Aa
- Primary outflows: Münstersche Aa
- Basin countries: Germany
- Surface area: 0.402 km^{2} (0.155 sq mi)
- Max. depth: 2 m (6 ft 7 in)
- Surface elevation: 54 m (177 ft)
- Settlements: Münster

Lake Aasee is an artificial lake in Münster, Westphalia.

== Geography ==
The lake lies southwest of the city center. It has an area of 0.402 km^{2} (0.155 sq mi) and is approximately 2.3 km (1.4 mi) long. It is 2 metres (79 inches) at its deepest point. The lake is surrounded by numerous green spaces and trees, which makes it the largest recreational area in the city of Münster.

The lake blocks the water of Münster's Aa River and protects the city from flooding. It also provides cool air for the city, because mainly southwest air masses are cooled above the lake. Therefore, it has an important ecological and urban planning function for the city. This also applies to the increasingly natural environment around the lake, which offers breeding grounds and habitat areas for many species and as a result makes it a popular recreation area for the citizens of Münster. The water level fluctuates by up to a meter (39 inches).

== History ==
During the siege of Munster by Prince Bishop Christoph Bernhard von Galen on December 18, 1660, two earth walls collapsed, cutting off the city's water supply, causing large parts of the city to be flooded. Münster then surrendered to the besiegers. Even years later, the floodwaters from the collapse of the dam could still be seen at the site of today's Lake Aasee.

Until the beginning of the 19th century there were still wetlands and swampy meadows, caused by the 1660 flood, where the Aa River was running through. These meadows were regularly flooded, sometimes the water level rose high enough to flood the historic downtown of Münster. As early as 1888, Hermann Landois, a professor of zoology in Münster, advocated for the construction of an "Aa basin" to better control the level of the Aa River. At the same time, Landois wanted to guarantee the city's drinking water supply with the reservoir, enable sports activities such as rowing, sailing and swimming. The lake should contribute to the city's beautification, and also reduce the source of pathogens by flushing the Aa bed, since the Aa also acts as a sewage canal for the city. In spring 1914, a quarter of a century after Landois´ explanations and nine years after his death, Italian workers started to implement his visions to reduce the risk of flooding for the city of Münster.

However, the excavation for the artificial lake had already been interrupted that year by World War I. The construction, under mayor Georg Sperlich, was only resumed after a serious flooding in 1925. The lake was finally completed in 1934 with a water surface of 20.7 hectares (51 acres). Under the Nazis there were plans to build an amphitheatre in the surrounding meadows. These plans were discarded after the end of the war and, instead, in 1972 to 1976 the lake south of the Torminbridge was expanded by 19.5 hectares (48 acres) to almost double the size, as part of the construction work for the Münster Allwetterzoo. In 1976, the park areas were enlarged by 50 hectares to a total of 90 hectares, with about 10 kilometers of trails that run through it and around 18 hectares (44 acres) of lawn for recreation.

Later, shallow water zones were created on the banks of the new part of the Aasee. They were intended to reduce the nutrition load of the inflowing water. In 1996 the riverside landscape was redesigned as far as Haus Kump. In 2008 the Aaseeterrassen were opened. These steps for visitors to sit on are on the most northern point of the water near to the city. The lake "Aasee" area is home to three restaurants, a boat rental, a boating school and three sailing clubs: Segel-Club Münster, Segelclub Hansa Münster and Westfälisch-Holsteinische Seglervereinigung mit Hochschulsegelclub Münster (WHS/HSC).

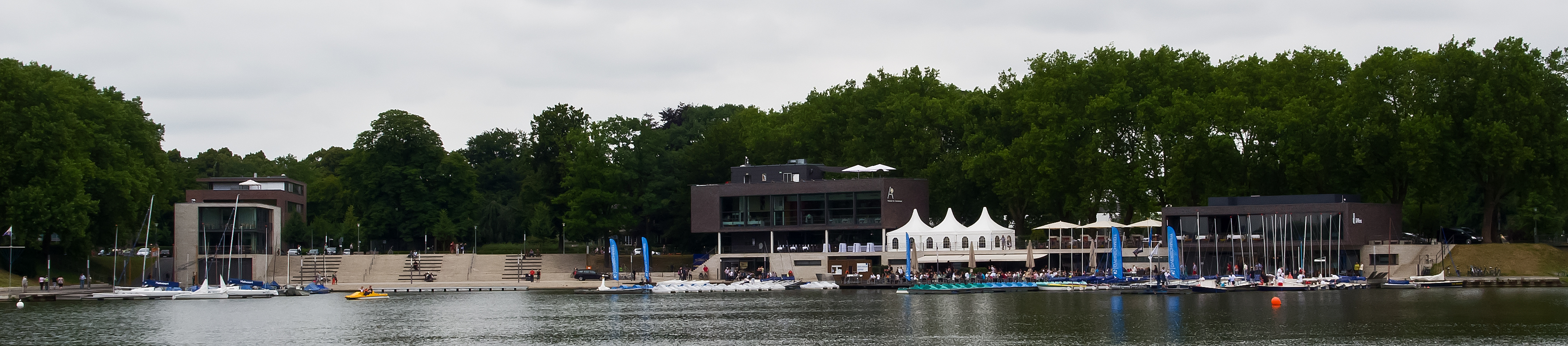
Aaseeterrassen

In 2009, the Aasee Park was named "Most Beautiful Park in Europe" after being voted "Germany's Most Beautiful Park" in 2008.

In the first half of 2012, the "Badestraße fish ladder" was built. The intention was to enable the continuity of the Aasee weir for aquatic organisms in accordance with the requirements of the Water Framework Directive. Due to limited space available in the inner city, the so-called "slotted pass construction" was chosen for this fish ladder. (→water quality)

== Life around the lake Aasee ==
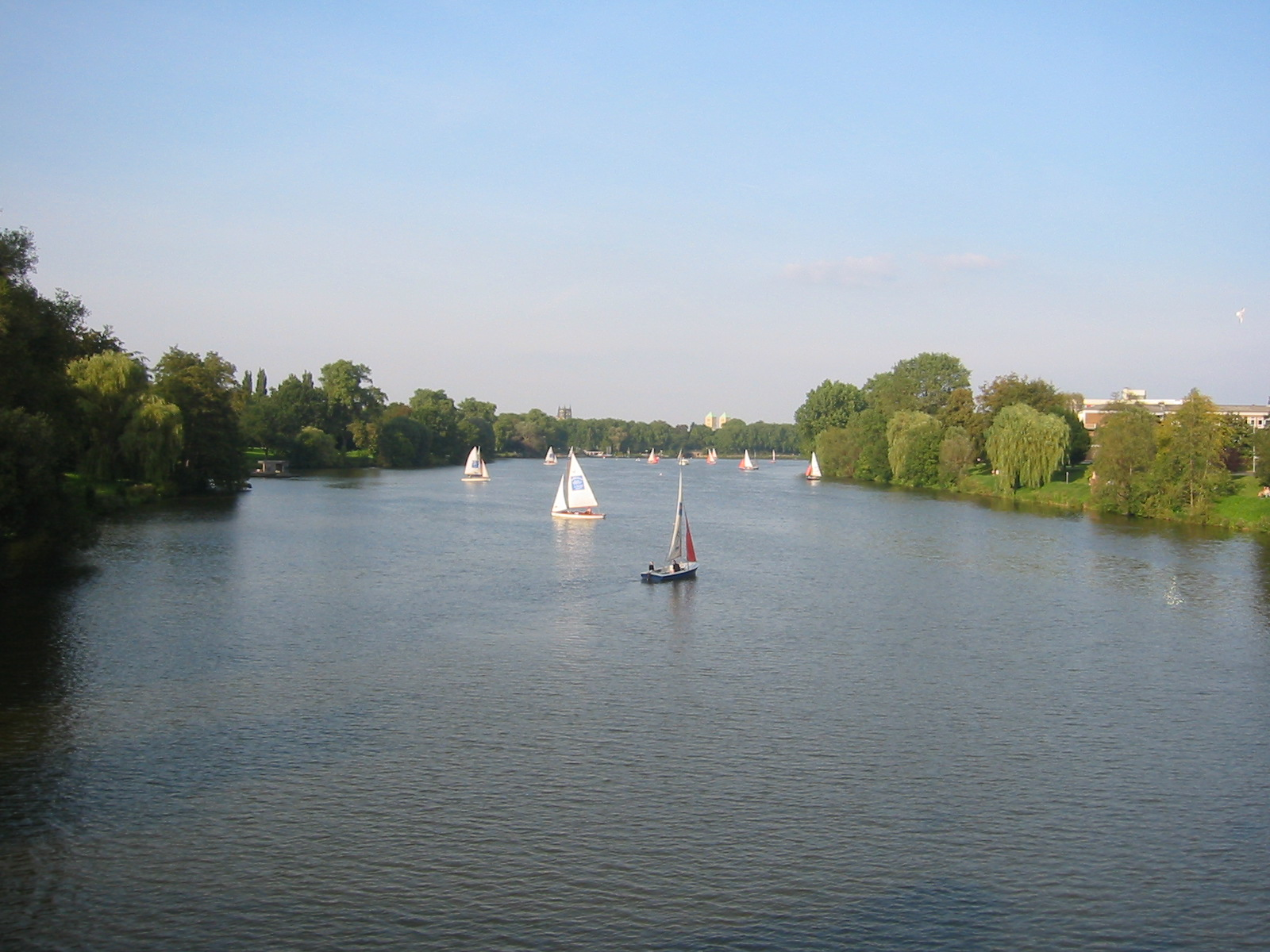
2004-09-07-Aasee Münster

Today the lake is the centerpiece of a popular recreation destination near the city center. A youth hostel, several student residences, the student canteen at the Aasee, the "Sentruperhöhe" sports park, the Allwetterzoo Münster with the Westphalian Horse Museum Münster, the LWL (Regional Association of Westphalia-Lippe) Museum for Natural History with a planetarium and the "Mühlenhof" open-air museum Münster are located at the Aasee. There are two small sailing boat harbors with a variety of places to eat. A hiking and jogging trail of about 5.7 km (3.5 mi) length leads around the lake.

A rowing regatta is held every spring. Around 900 rowers in 470 boats took part in the 42nd spring regatta on April 20 and 21, 2013.Juniors from the age of 17 participated as well as the adult participants over the Olympic distance of 2000 meters, which stretches over the entire length of Lake Aasee. Younger athletes could compete over a distance of 1500 meters, while the older ones go in for 1000 meters.

Since 2009, Lake Aasee has been one of the venues for the German Rowing League. In September 2012, the German Sprint Championships were held in Münster. From October 11 to 18, 2013 the 100th German championship of the rowing eight on the long distance took place.

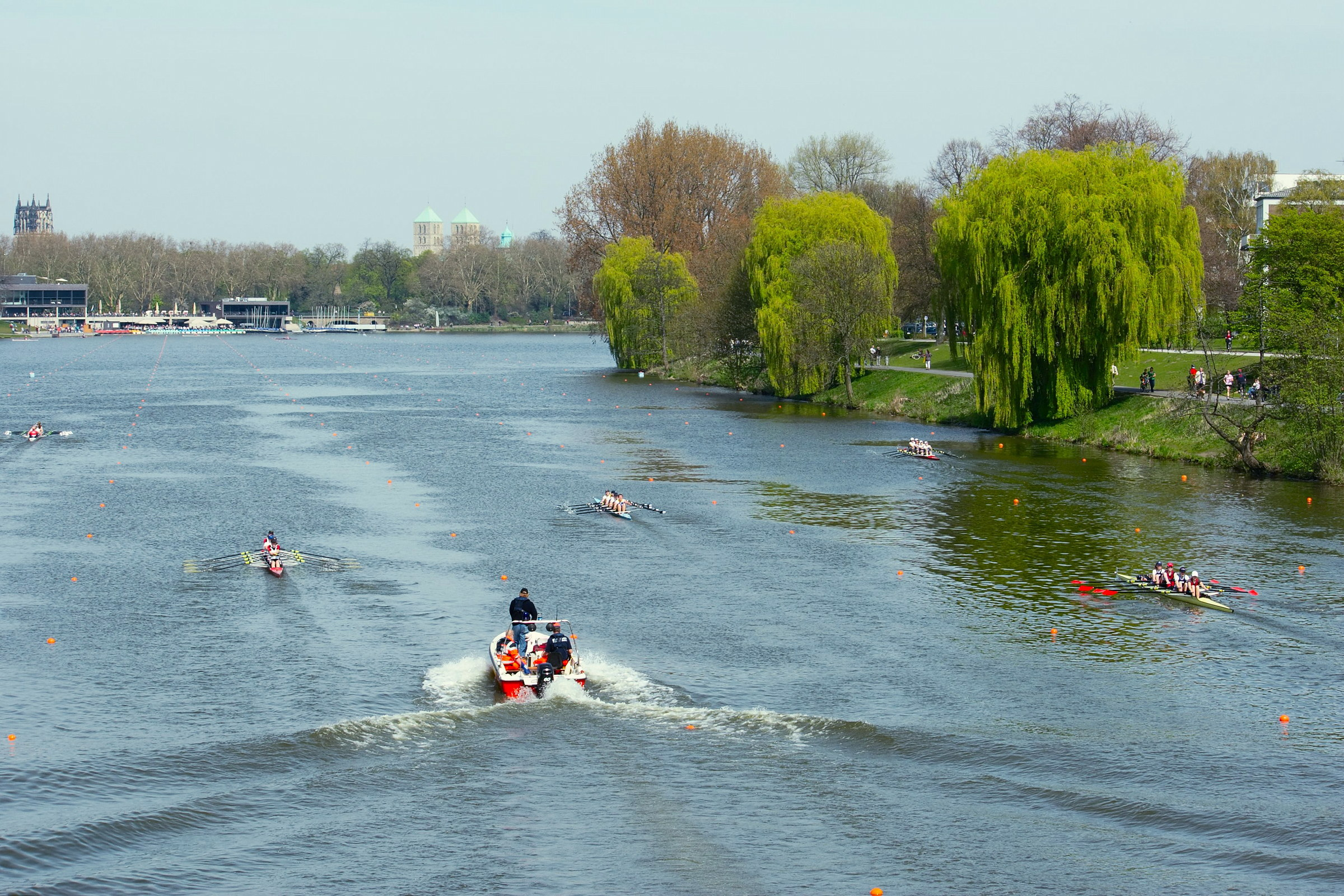
Rowing regatta in April 2010

On April 12 and 13, 2013, for the third time a ranking regatta of the Paralympic one-man keelboat class 2.4mR was held on Lake Aasee.

The oldest hot-air balloon event in Germany, has been held on the Aasee meadows since 1969. The Montgolfiade is organized every August by the "Freiballonsport-Verein Münster und Münsterland e. V." in cooperation with the sports department of the city of Münster. This local recreation area serves as a sailing venue for two sailing clubs. In autumn, the Pirates' Aasee Cup, organized by the Münster Sailing Club, takes place on the part of the lake nearest to the city. On the upper Aasee, the part of the lake farther away from the city center, the pirate regatta "Bockwurst Challenge", the "Laser Cup" for all laser classes and the optimist "Kiepenkerlregatta" are held every year as ranking list regattas by the "Hansa Münster" sailing club.

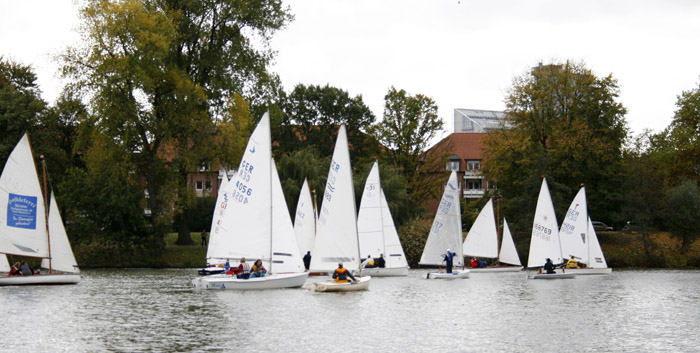
The local recreation area serves as a sailing area for two sailing clubs

Especially on May 1 (Mayday holiday) the Aasee draws crowds of guests who visit the local recreation area for a barbecue. After May 1, 2013, employees of the waste management company of Münster collected six tons of trash from the park area around Lake Aasee. The underground bins for waste and hot barbecue ashes, installed the year before, have been well received.

The stairs of the Aasee terraces offer space for 2,000 spectators at events to sit on. Episodes of the Wilsberg crime series, set in Münster, are regularly shown there. Classical concerts with international cast known as "AaSeerenaden" have also been performed on the Aasee Terraces since 2010 and end always with a fireworks display. A musical program ranging from "jazz to classical, orchestra to choir, pop to baroque" is regularly performed. Intendant (artistic director) is Peter von Wienhardt. According to the organizers, more than 20,000 visitors take part in the three-day event and its supporting program.

=== Water bus ===
The "Waterbus Professor Landois", which was named after Hermann Landois, the founder of the zoo in Münster, was built from mahagony on oak in a shipyard on Dümmersee (lake Dümmer) in 1974 based on the model of a Dutch canal boat with a length of 17 meters and a width of 4.50 meters. After 36 years of service and its last trip, the water bus was transferred to a shipyard in Stralsund on November 6, 2011. The successor was also built there.

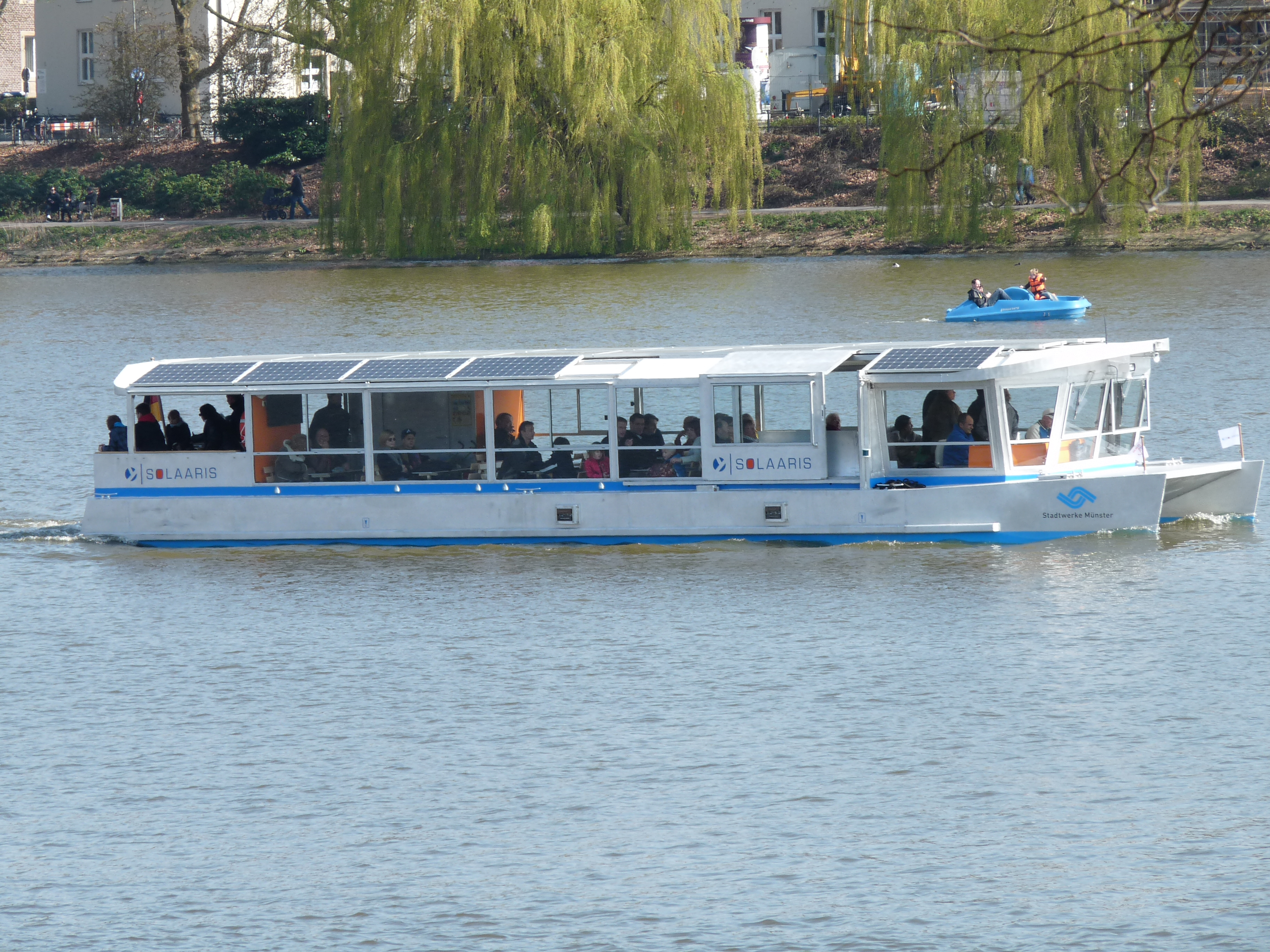
Solaaris on lake Aasee

The successor "Solaaris" is a solar catamaran made entirely of aluminum and powered by two electric motors. At full load, the electric motors have a volume of 55 decibels and accelerate the craft to 9.8 km/h (about 6.1 m/h). The usual service speed is 7 km/h (4.3 m/h). The Solaaris has no alternative drive to its electric motor. Solaaris is almost 16 meters long, has disability access and can accommodate 68 passengers. Its cost is approximately 500,000 Euros. The battery system alone comes to around 200,000 euros. Münster's department of public works subsidized Solaaris with a contribution in the amount of 55.000 Euros in 2012. The Solaaris was built in the Ostseestaal shipyard in Stralsund within 70 days. On March 23, 2012, she had her maiden voyage on the Baltic Sea. A day later it arrived on a flatbed truck in Münster at the Aasee. Lord Mayor Markus Lewe then christened the ship on April 2, 2012, at Lake Aasee. He cast off on the maiden voyage on Lake Aasee and scraped a sailing dinghy. Solaaris started its regular service on the Aasee on Good Friday, April 6, 2012. In the 27 weeks of service in 2012, the Solaaris, carrying 20,000 to 20,500 passengers, made 1,045 trips using solar energy. Since Solaaris is almost five meters wider than its predecessor Professor Landois, around 40 meters of sheet piling had to be removed in the Allwetterzoo Münster so that the boat could reach the zoo's harbor. Accordingly, divers were deployed by a Duisburg company who welded under water.

From June 12 to June 14, 2013, plays including Shakespeare's The Tempest were performed aboard the Solaaris.

== Water quality ==
Swimming and surfing in Lake Aasee are currently not recommended and even prohibited due to the poor water quality, especially in the hot summer months. However, there are efforts to improve the water quality. The main problems are the blue-green algae, which are multiplying in large numbers due to over-fertilization, but also E. coli bacteria. Skin contact with the Aasee water can lead to irritation in summer, and swallowing it can lead to life-threatening illnesses. The Hygiene Institute of the Westfälische Wilhelms-Universität Münster has meanwhile reduced the number of blue-green algae in particular with the help of appropriate chemicals to remove nutrients from the lake. Good results have already been achieved after two years of use.

However, the main sources of eutrophication in the lake have not been eliminated. In many places, the Münstersche Aa is still surrounded by a lot of farmlands and the fields drain into the river. Pollutants like nutrients, streets and sewage treatment plants should also not be neglected. The trophic level of a still body of water as in the Aasee cannot be kept permanently low. Without extreme structural interventions such as deep-water drainage or heavy dredging, it will not be possible to permanently eliminate the sapropel that has been created as a negative side effect of the long period of anaerobic conditions.

It should also be noted that the trophic level of a still body of water like the Aasee cannot be kept permanently low. Without extreme structural interventions such as the deep-water drainage method or heavy dredging, it will not be possible to permanently eliminate the sapropel that has been created as a negative factor by the long period of anaerobic conditions.

In 2012, a fish ladder was completed at the cost of 350,000 Euros. The water quality of Lake Aasee will be improved by the exchange of microbes, which has not been possible for 90 years due to the weir on the street Badestraße. The fish-ladder allows organisms such as fish and microbes to migrate again. Likewise, the stocks of non-predatory fish in Lake Aasee, such as bream, should mix with the predatory fish, including pike and zander, from the Münstersche Aa in order to stabilize the ecosystem. The construction of the fish ladder was planned in 2010 but was postponed due to a lack of funds. Construction work began in July 2011 and lasted until autumn 2011.

Furthermore, by ecological measures like renaturing the course of the Münstersche Aa south of the Aasee via Haus Kump to Sentruper Straße the water quality of the Aasee is to be improved. The Aa River is now a curvaceous, natural and, above all, the flood defying body of water again². A sand filter was created at the height of Haus Kump, which is intended to prevent further silting up of the Aasee. In addition, the creation of a body of standing water is intended to lower the temperature of the inflow into the Aasee by a few degrees to reduce the growth of blue-green algae.
