= Kannenbach =

River in Germany

Location
- Country: Germany
- State: North Rhine-Westphalia

Physical characteristics
- Mouth
  - location: Dortmund–Ems Canal
  - coordinates: 51.8725°N 7.5626°E
- Length: 7.4 km (4.6 mi)

Basin features
- Progression: Dortmund–Ems Canal→ Ems→ North Sea

Kannenbach is a small river of North Rhine-Westphalia, Germany. It discharges into the Dortmund–Ems Canal near Senden.

== See also ==
- List of rivers of North Rhine-Westphalia
