= Kinderbach (Münstersche Aa) =

River in North Rhine-Westphalia, Germany

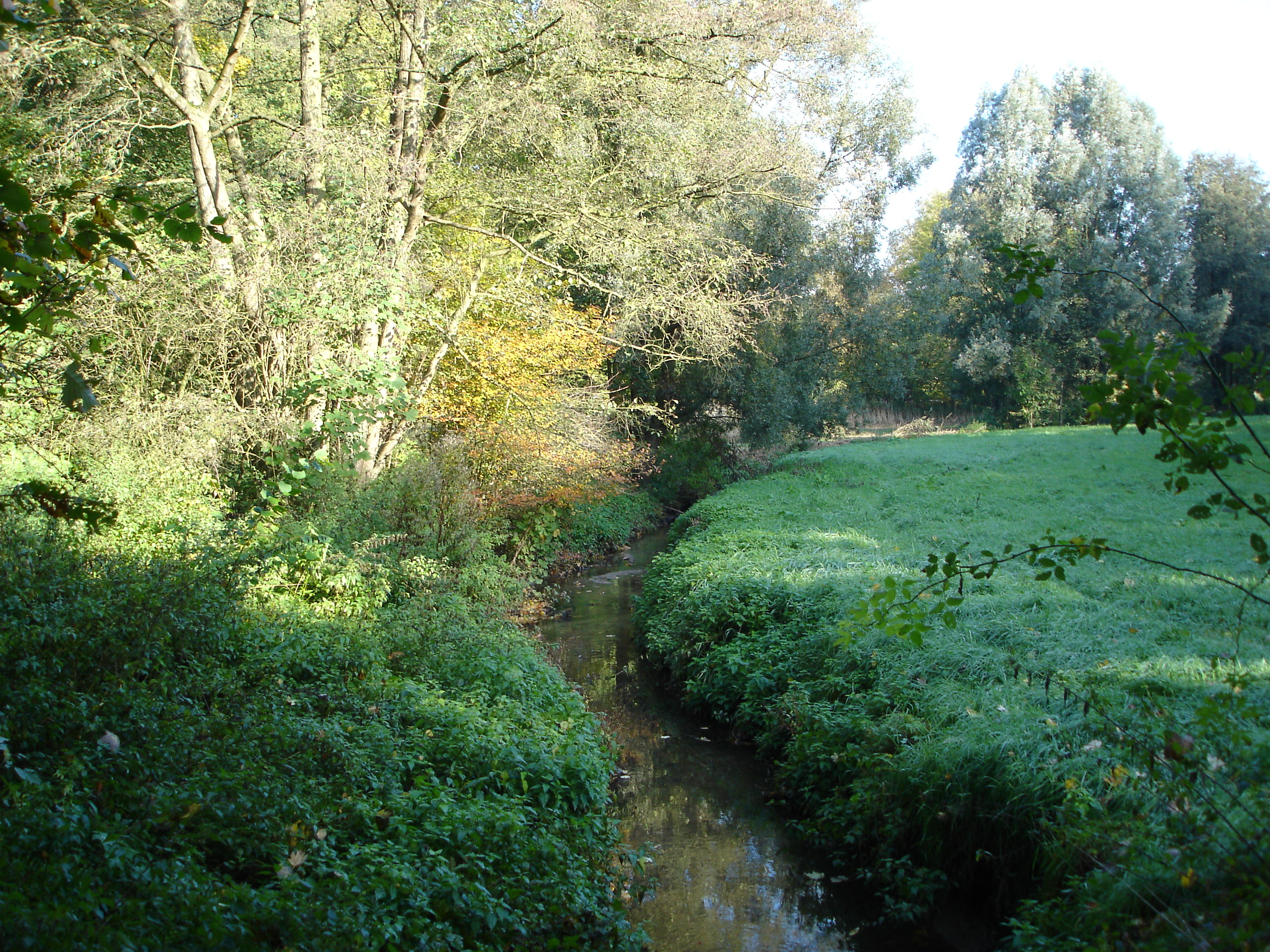

Location
- Country: Germany
- State: North Rhine-Westphalia

Physical characteristics
- Mouth
  - location: Münstersche Aa
  - coordinates: 52.0050°N 7.6253°E
- Length: 10.6 km (6.6 mi)

Basin features
- Progression: Münstersche Aa→ Ems→ North Sea

Kinderbach is a river of North Rhine-Westphalia, Germany. It flows into the Münstersche Aa north of Münster.

== See also ==
- List of rivers of North Rhine-Westphalia
