= Münster Zoo =

Allwetterzoo Münster
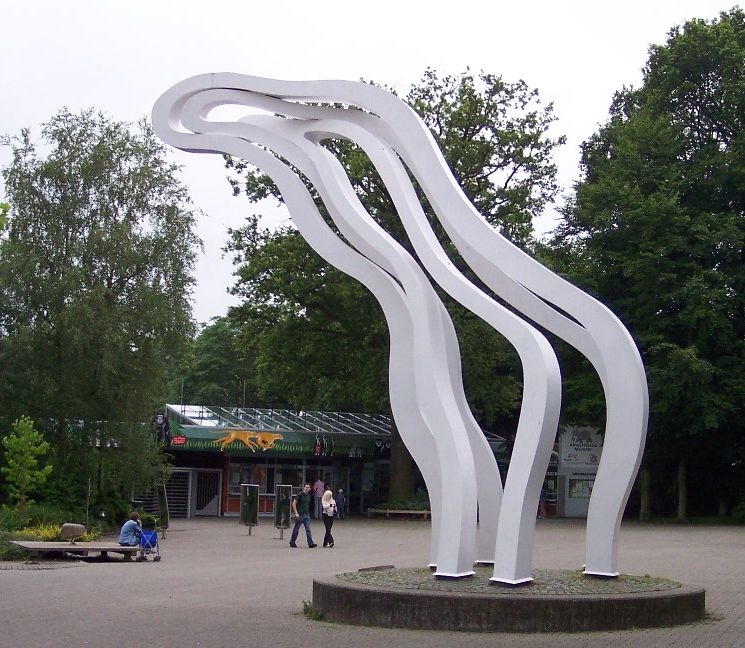
- Entrance
- Interactive map of Allwetterzoo Münster
- 51°56′47″N 7°35′30″E
- Slogan: „hautnah“ erleben!
- Date opened: 1974
- Location: Sentruper Straße 315; 48161 Münster, Germany
- Land area: 30 hectares (74.1 acres)
- No. of animals: 3054
- No. of species: 320
- Annual visitors: 976.032 ( 2013)
- Memberships: EAZA, WAZA
- Owner: Stadt Münster, Westfälischer Zoologischer Garten Münster GmbH
- Director: Thomas Wilms
- Website: www.allwetterzoo.de

The Allwetterzoo Münster is a zoo in Münster in Westfalen, Germany. The zoo was founded in 1875. In 1973, the Zoologische Garten zu Münster was closed and replaced in 1974 by the new Allwetterzoo Münster, which was built in a tree-rich area close to the lake Aasee.

== Staff ==
In 2012, 85 people (including management) worked at the Allwetterzoo Münster zoo. Amongst those, most (46 people) worked as zookeepers, four were part of an education program, and eleven involved in commercial sale or technical section. Six gardners were tending the plants and six people worked in management.

=== Management ===
Until the end of the 1950s, the chairman of the board was the official director. However, since 1960, the title is "Zoo director." Since 1985, the zoo is managed by Westfälischer Zoologischer Garten GmbH .

Chairman of the board
Zoo Directors
- 1871–1876 Hermann Landois
- 1876–1884 Franz v.Olfers
- 1884–1894 Vormann
- 1894–1905 Hermann Landois
- 1906–1907 B. Wulff
- 1907–1909 Paul Maerker
- 1909–1910 Wohmann
- 1910–1922 Ferdinand Verfürth
- 1924–1928 Hermann Reichling
- 1928–1933 Rincklage
- 1933–1937 Karl Humborg
- 1937–1945 Franz Falger
- 1945–1948 Hermann Reichling
- 1948–1952 Theodor Geringhoff
- 1952–1959 Julius Rohr
- 1959–1974 Matthias Lückertz
- 1974–1979 Heinrich Stadtbäumer
- 1979–1982 Werner Schulze Buschhoff
- 1982–1997 Rudolf Wilbrand
- 1997–2001 Ralph Ziegler
- 2001–2008 Katharina Krüger
- since 2008 Helge Peters
- 1875–1905 Hermann Landois
- 1908–1925 Heinrich Goffart
- 1925–1933 Richard Neuhaus
- 1933 Abel
- 1934 Goffart
- 1934–1936 M. Hans Bungartz
- 1936–1945 Heinz Randow
- 1945–1948 Hermann Reichling
- 1949–1957 Ludwig Zukowsky
- 1957–1960 Heinemann
- 1960–1980 Helmut Reichling
- 1980–1994 Götz Ruempler
- 1994–2015: H. Jörg Adler
- since 2016: Thomas Wilms

== Animal numbers ==
This table shows the development of animal numbers in the zoo until 2015.

Datum	Total		Mammals		Birds		Reptiles		Amphibia		Fish		Invertebrates	
Datum	Species		Species		Species		Species		Species		Species		Species	
1914	218													
31 March 1930	210	618												
31 March 1934	293	860	90	226	197	625	6	9						
31 December 1950	162	474	45	137	137	283	9	44	1	8				
Summer 1956	330	920												
31 December 1962	341	1164												
31 December 1965	337	1202												
Summer 1972	380	1700												
April 1975	408	1355	83	396	169	489	60	143	2	2	86	277	8	48
31 December 1979	423	1970												
31 December 1984	391	2030												
31 December 1989	352	2242												
31 December 1994	338	2220												
31 December 1999	319	3401	63	584	105	586	33	192	11	221	75	1165	32	653
31 December 2005	368	3518	73	650	98	558	52	230	10	137	100	1516	35	427
31 December 2008	302	3088	64	580	78	517	29	148	7	43	78	1339	46	461
31 December 2012	295	3020	63	557	61	484	24	75	7	48	84	1194	56	662
31 December 2013	320	3054	60	617	59	477	24	87	6	39	93	1050	78	784
31 December 2014	345	3492	72	585	65	486	33	101	7	50	97	1299	86	910
31 December 2015	298	3447	65	431	56	442	21	101	6	78	75	1333	75	1062

=== Animals in Allwetterzoo Münster ===
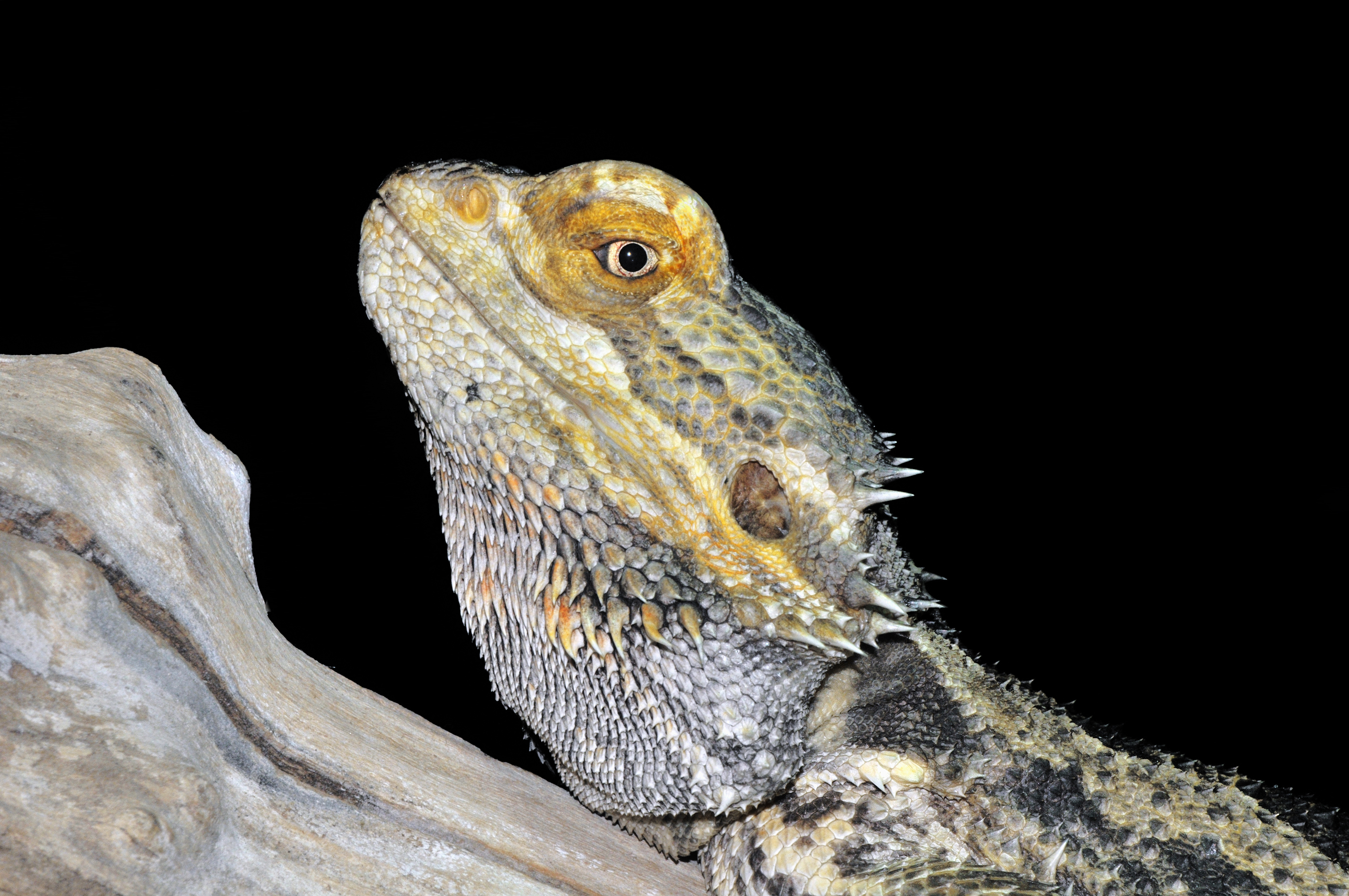
Central bearded dragon

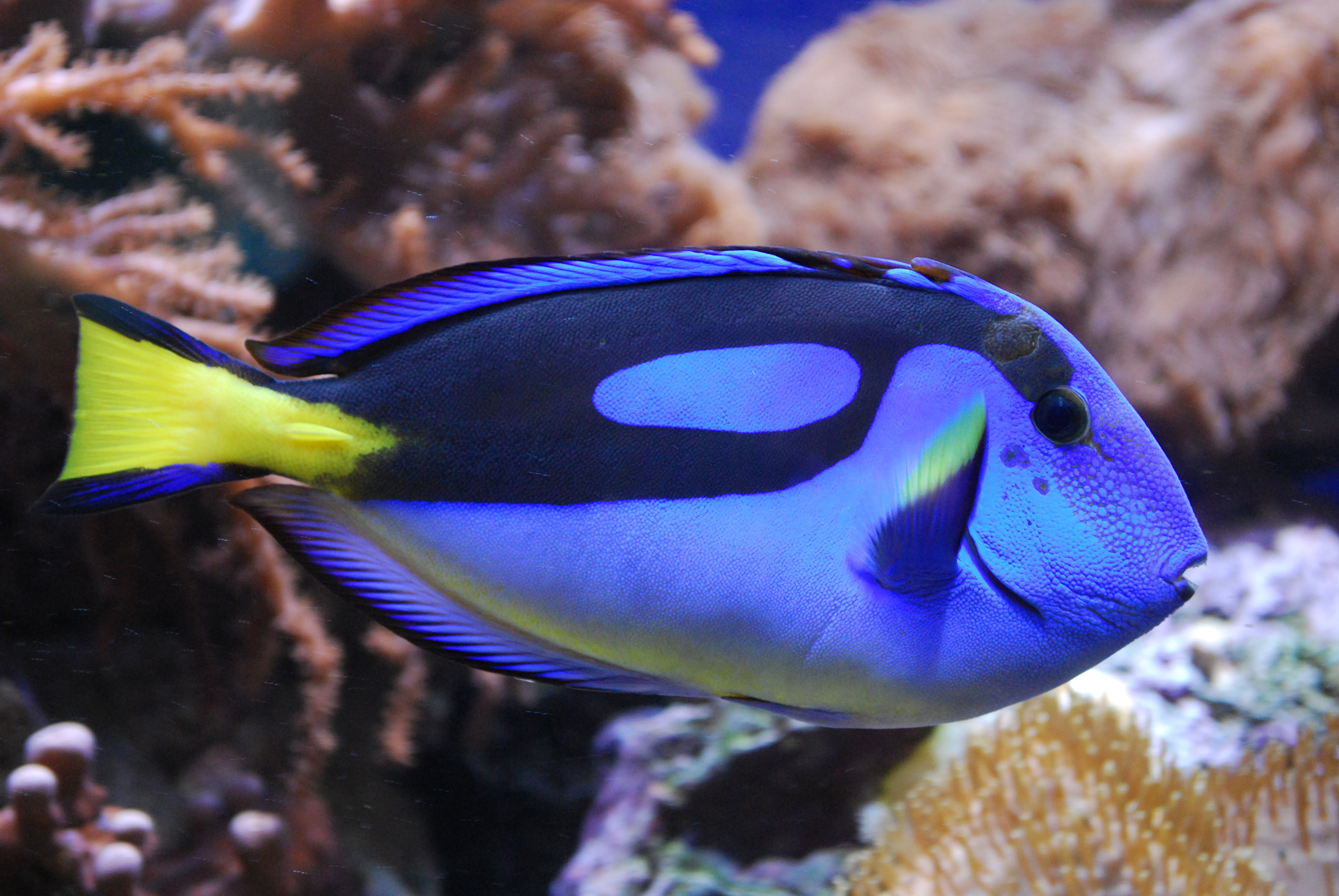
Paracanthurus hepatus

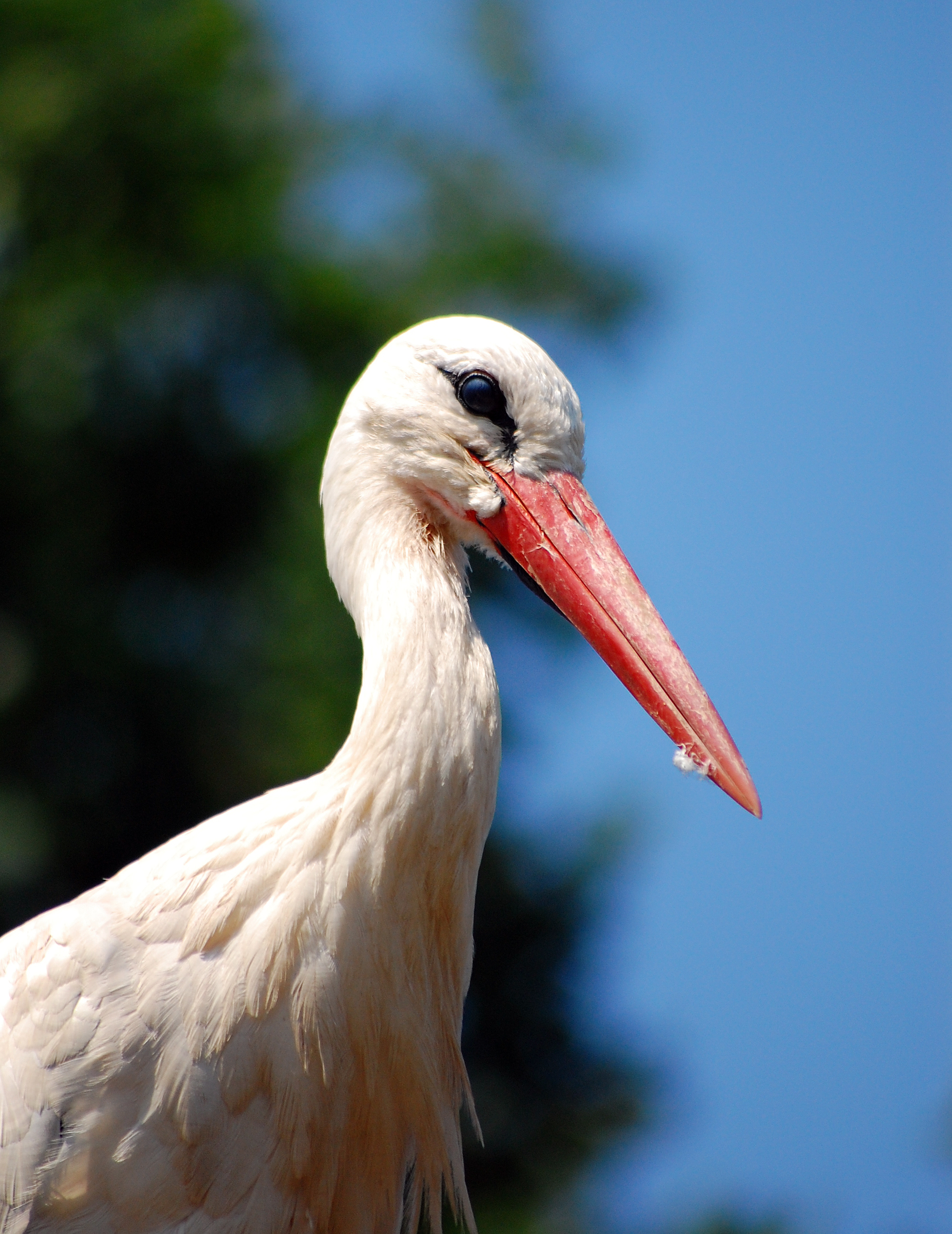
White stork

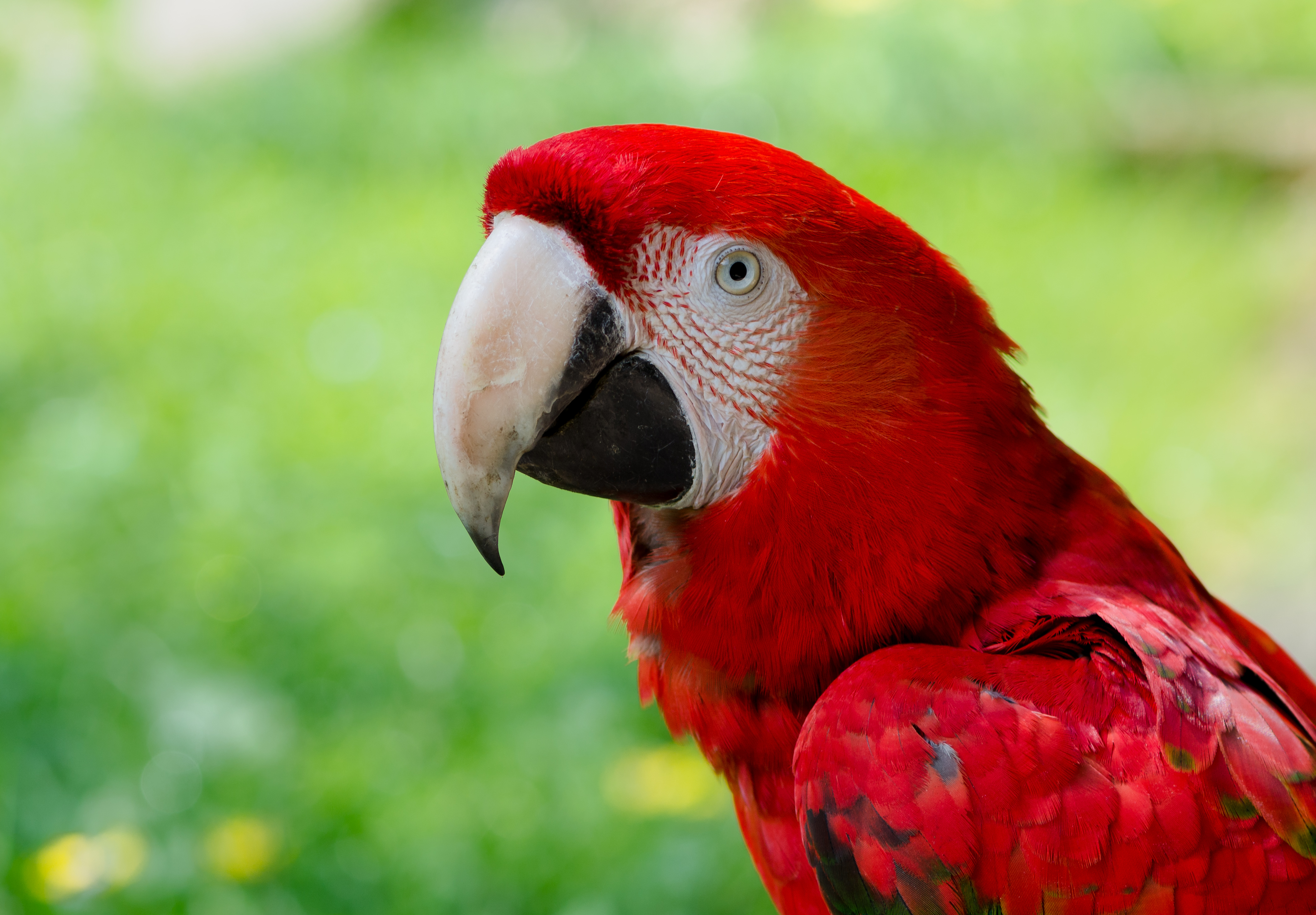
Hybrid of Green-winged Macaw and Scarlet Macaw

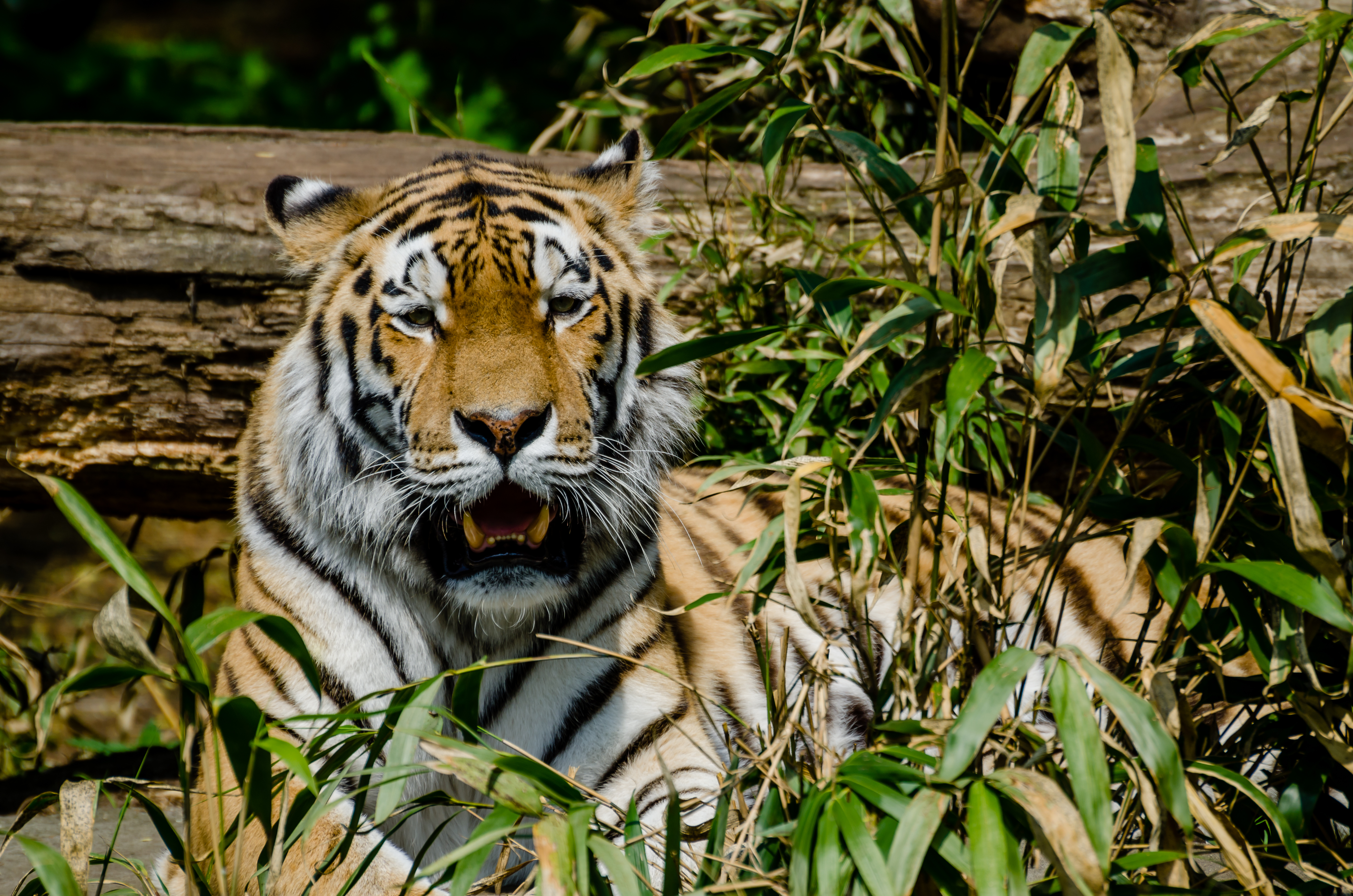
Tiger

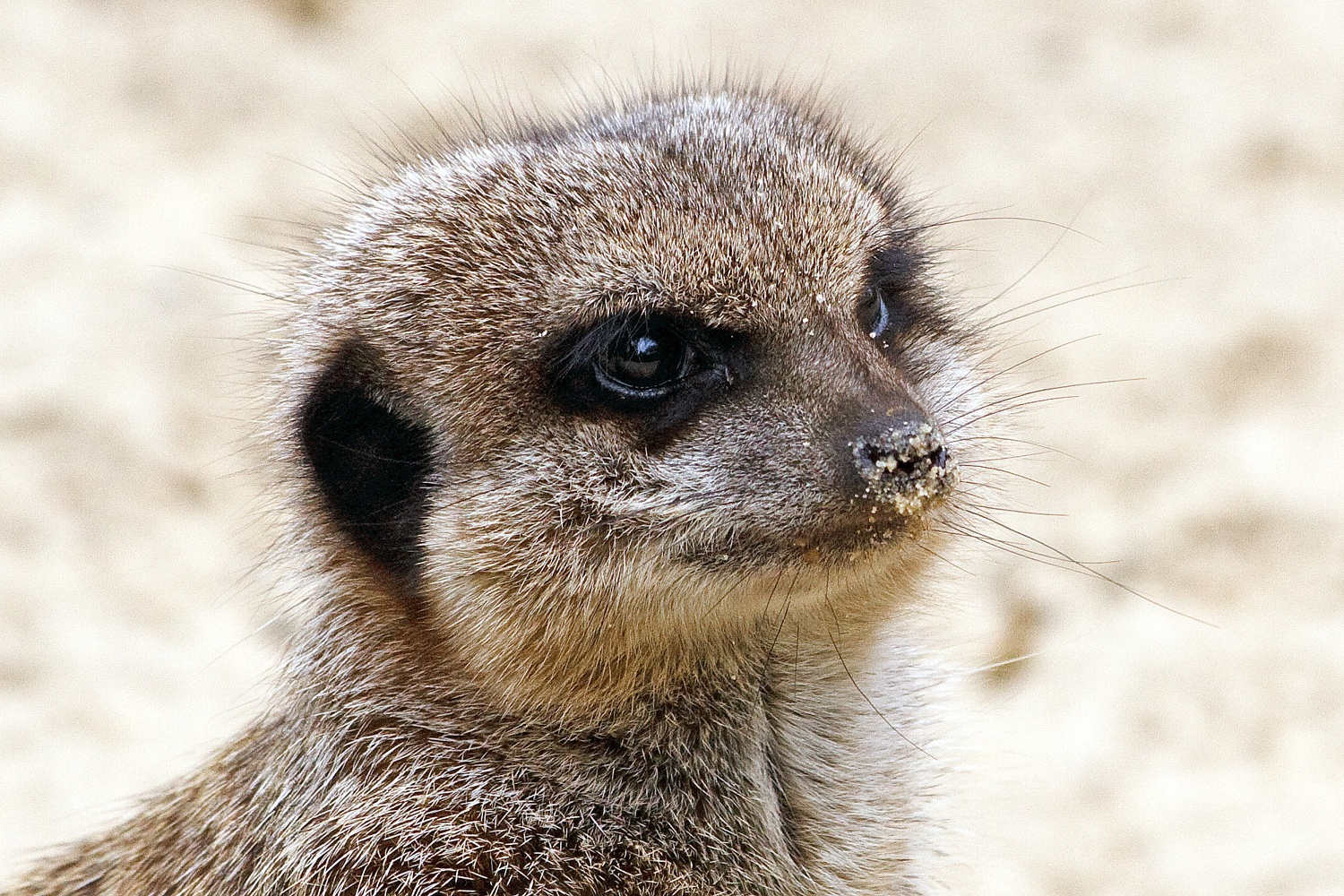
Meerkat

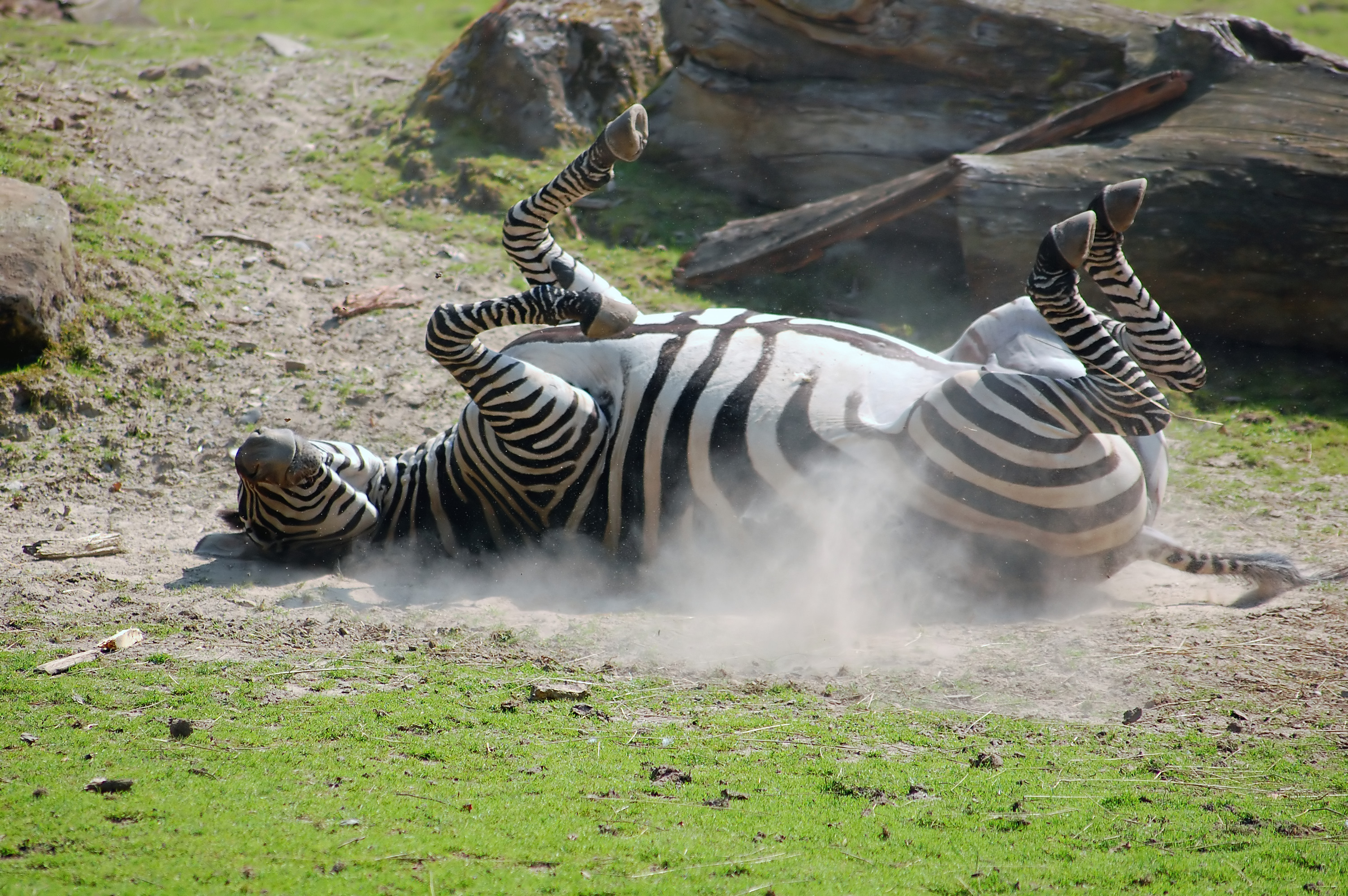
A Plains Zebra

== Visitors ==
The tables below show the annual number of visitors to the zoo, sorted by year.

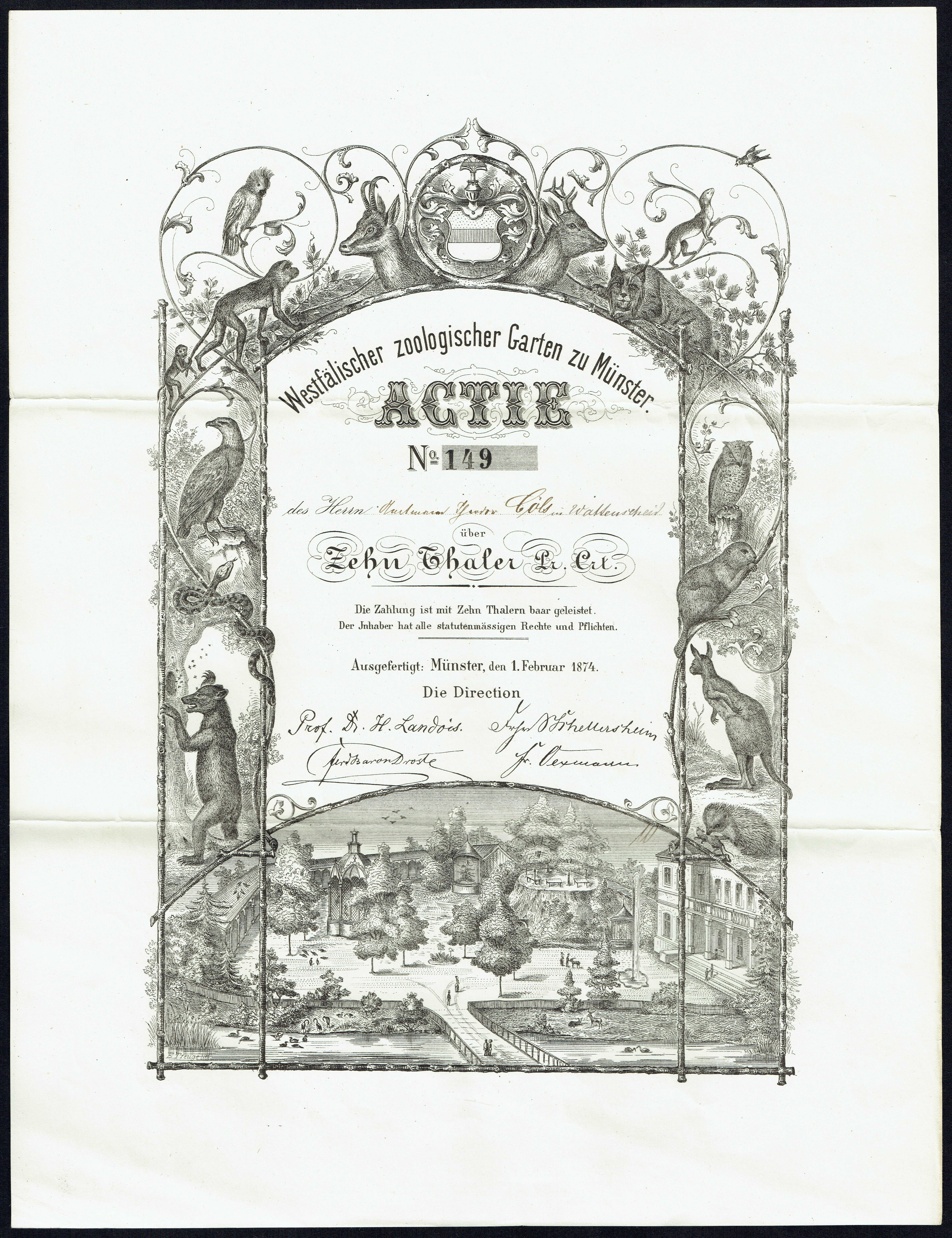
Share of the Westfälischer Zoologischer Garten zu Münster, issued 1. February 1874, signed by Hermann Landois

Year	Visitors
1921/22	129.102
1922/23	127.739
1924/25	137.078
1928/29	178.711
1932/33	145.405
1936/37	178.185
1950	199.680
1955	327.707
1962	470.000
1964	>500.000
1974	1.242.431
1979	767.129

Year	Visitors
1984	825.096
1989	845.997
1994	718.127
1999	830.903
2003	908.447
2004	895.200
2005	977.324
2006	1.031:st337
2007	1.018.754
2008	950.760
2009	991.990
2010	871.427

Year	Visitors
2011	935.918
2012	938.360
2013	976.032
2014	947.730 (VDZ-Schlüssel)
	556.305 (gezählt)
2015	915.000 (VDZ-Schlüssel)
	618.000 (gezählt)

== See also ==
- List of zoos in Germany
