= Münstersche Aa =

River in Germany

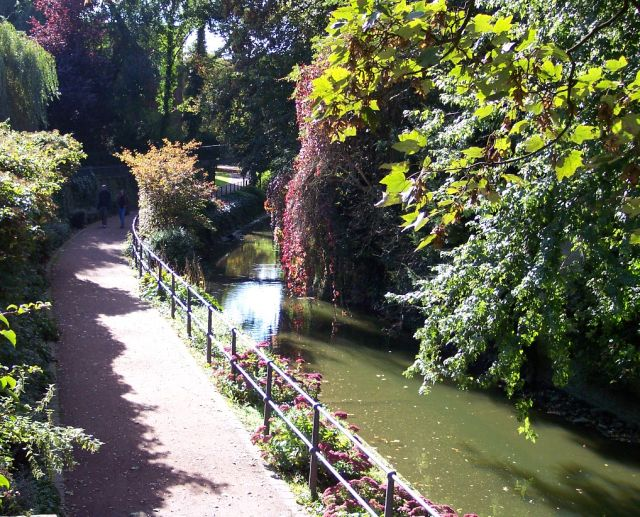

Location
- Country: Germany
- State: North Rhine-Westphalia

Physical characteristics
- Mouth
  - location: Ems
  - coordinates: 52°05′09″N 7°36′21″E
- Length: 43.4 km (27.0 mi)
- Basin size: 172 km^{2} (66 sq mi)

Basin features
- Progression: Ems→ North Sea

The Münstersche Aa (German pronunciation: [ˌmʏnstɐʃə ˈʔaː]) is a river in the Münster region of Westphalia in Germany. It is a left tributary of the Ems. The Münstersche Aa begins near Havixbeck, flows southeast until Münster, and then north to Greven, where it flows into the Ems. The total length of the Münstersche Aa is about 43 kilometres (27 mi).

== See also ==
- List of rivers of North Rhine-Westphalia
