= Polar bear hunting =

Polar bear hunting may refer to:

- Polar bear hunting, an activity where polar bears are hunted for sport
- Knockout game or polar-bear hunting, a name used in U.S. media to refer to a violent "game" in which a white passerby is punched without warning
