= International Polar Bear Day =

Annual event celebrated on February 27

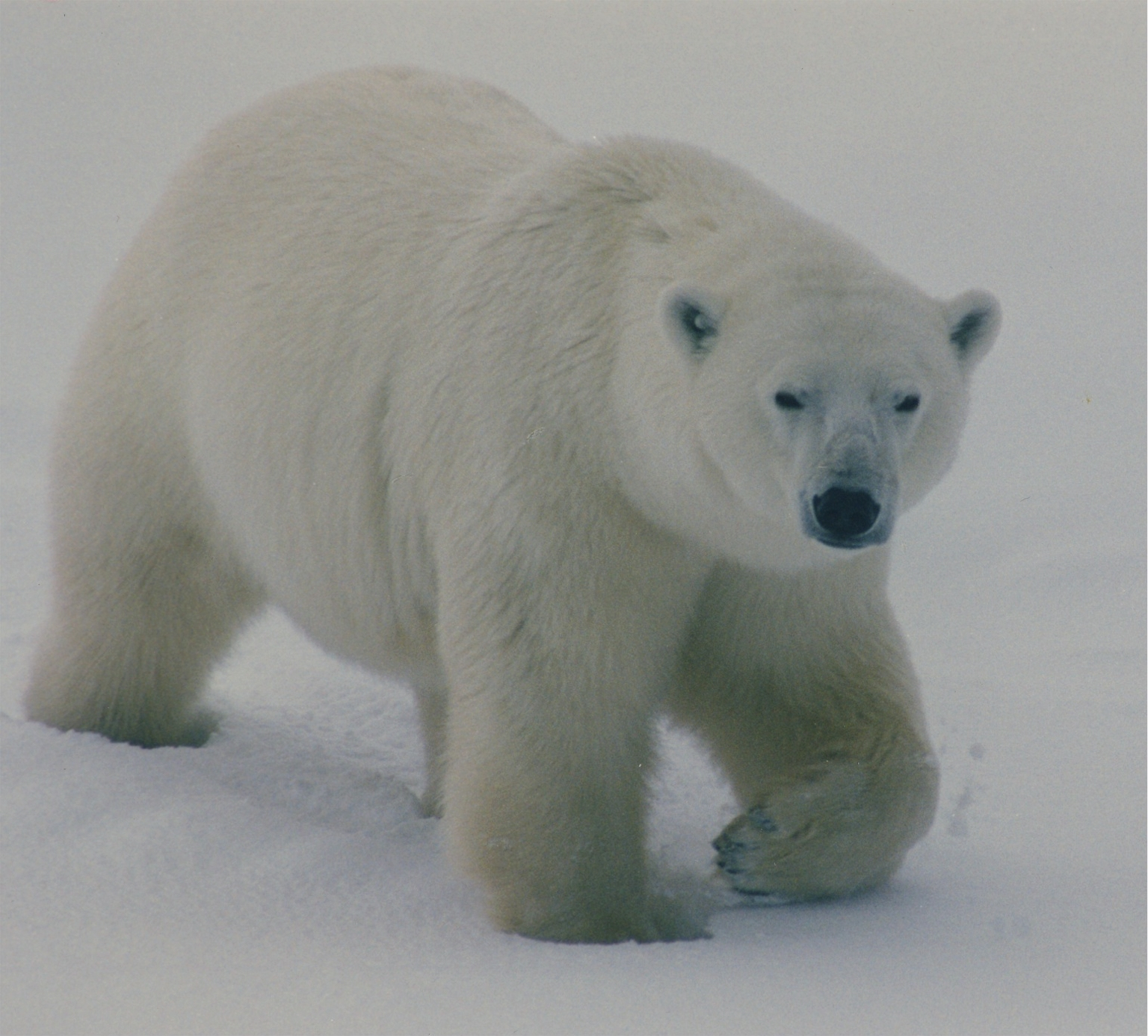
- Date: February 27
- Next time: 27 February 2027
- Frequency: Annual

International Polar Bear Day is an annual event celebrated every February 27, to coincide with the time period when polar bear mothers and cubs are sheltered in their snow dens, and to raise awareness about the conservation status of the polar bear.

== Description ==
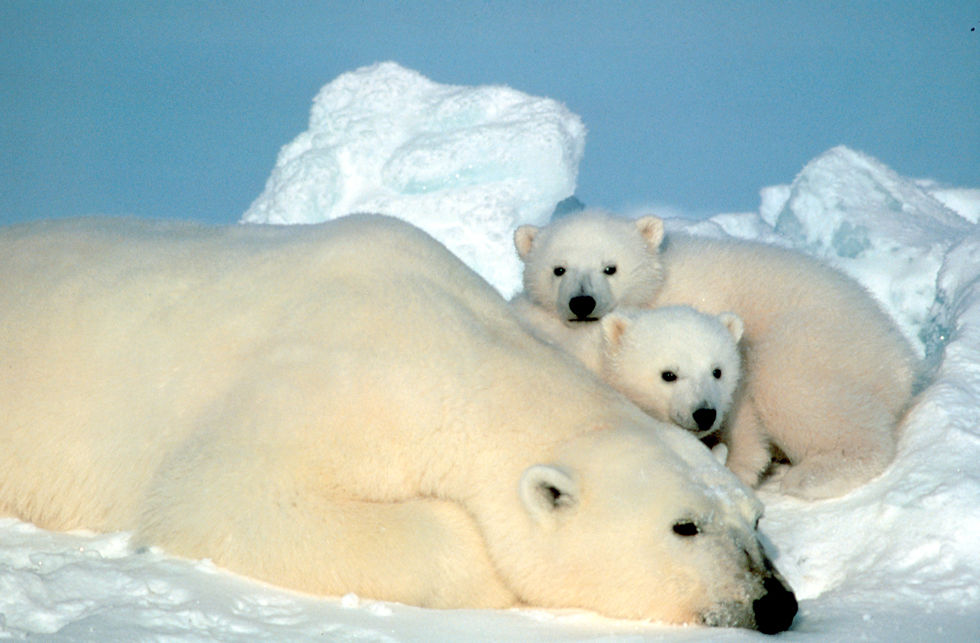
A polar bear mom with her cubs.

International Polar Bear Day is organized by Polar Bears International to raise awareness about the impact of global warming and reduced sea ice on polar bear populations. It also focuses on the need to protect polar bear moms and cubs during the vulnerable denning period. The awareness event has been used to celebrate the bears, encourage action on climate change and share information on research that informs polar bear conservation, including studies of moms and cubs.

== Observance ==
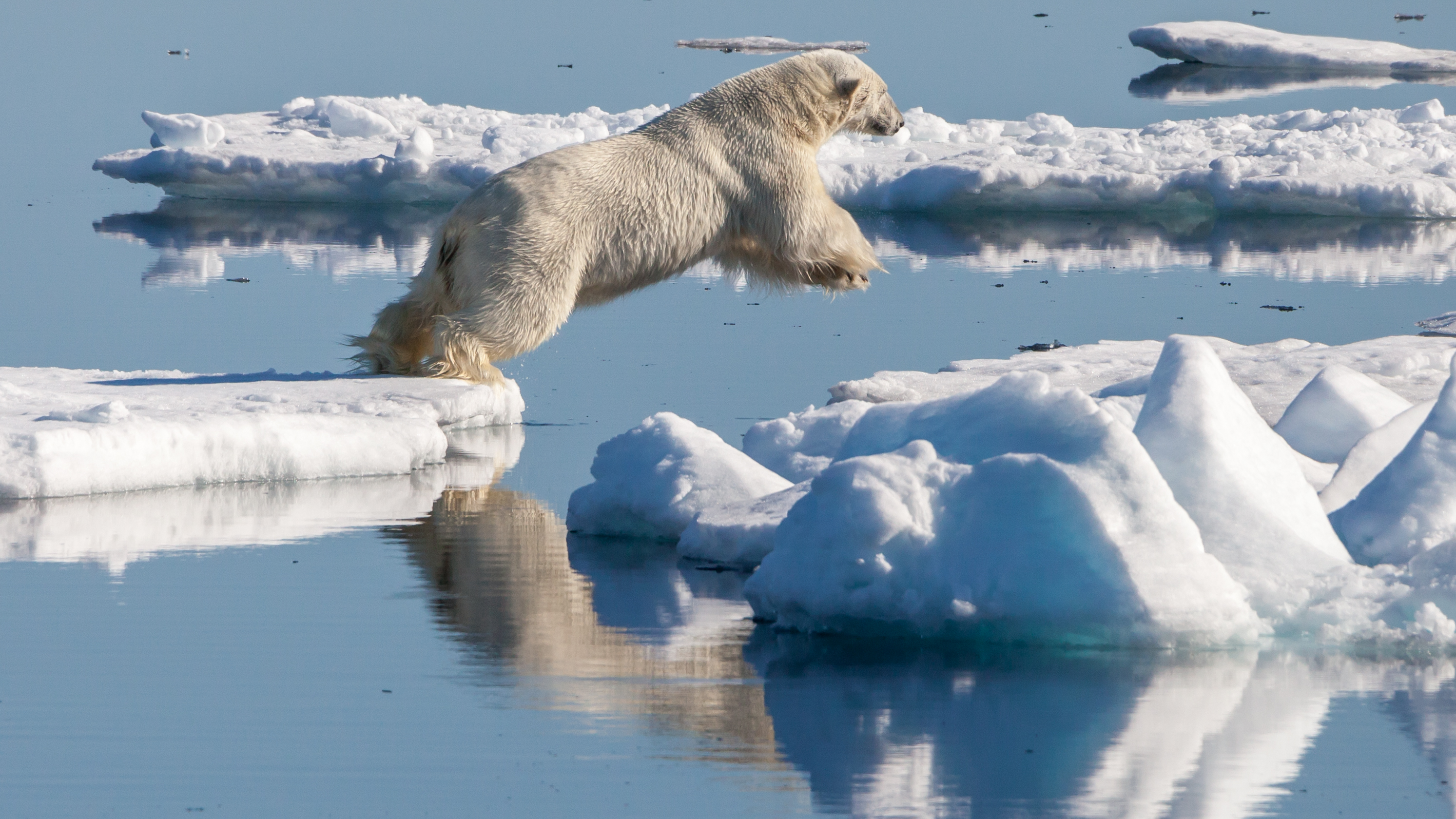
Polar bear (Ursus maritimus) in the drift ice region north of Svalbard

Many zoos use the day to educate the public about polar bear conservation and to encourage visits to polar bear exhibits. It has also had some political impact. Jack Shapiro, the deputy climate campaign manager under American president Barack Obama, used the day to argue for the need for Congressional action on the issue of climate change. It has also been used to draw attention to the need to protect denning polar bear families in the Arctic National Wildlife Refuge. The University of Saskatchewan announced in 2014 that it would be turning its thermostats up two degrees in the summer and down two degrees Celsius in the winter to honor International Polar Bear Day. The decision was expected to reduce the university's carbon emissions by two-thousand tons and save the university over two-hundred thousand dollars per year. International Polar Bear Day has been noted to be effective in raising awareness online about polar bears through information search. In 2026, International Polar Bear Day had a social media reach of over 500 million. It also generated press ranging from The Weather Network to CTV News Canada, IFL Science, Popular Science, and Happy Eco News.

== See also ==
- Polar Bears International
