= Iodine in biology =

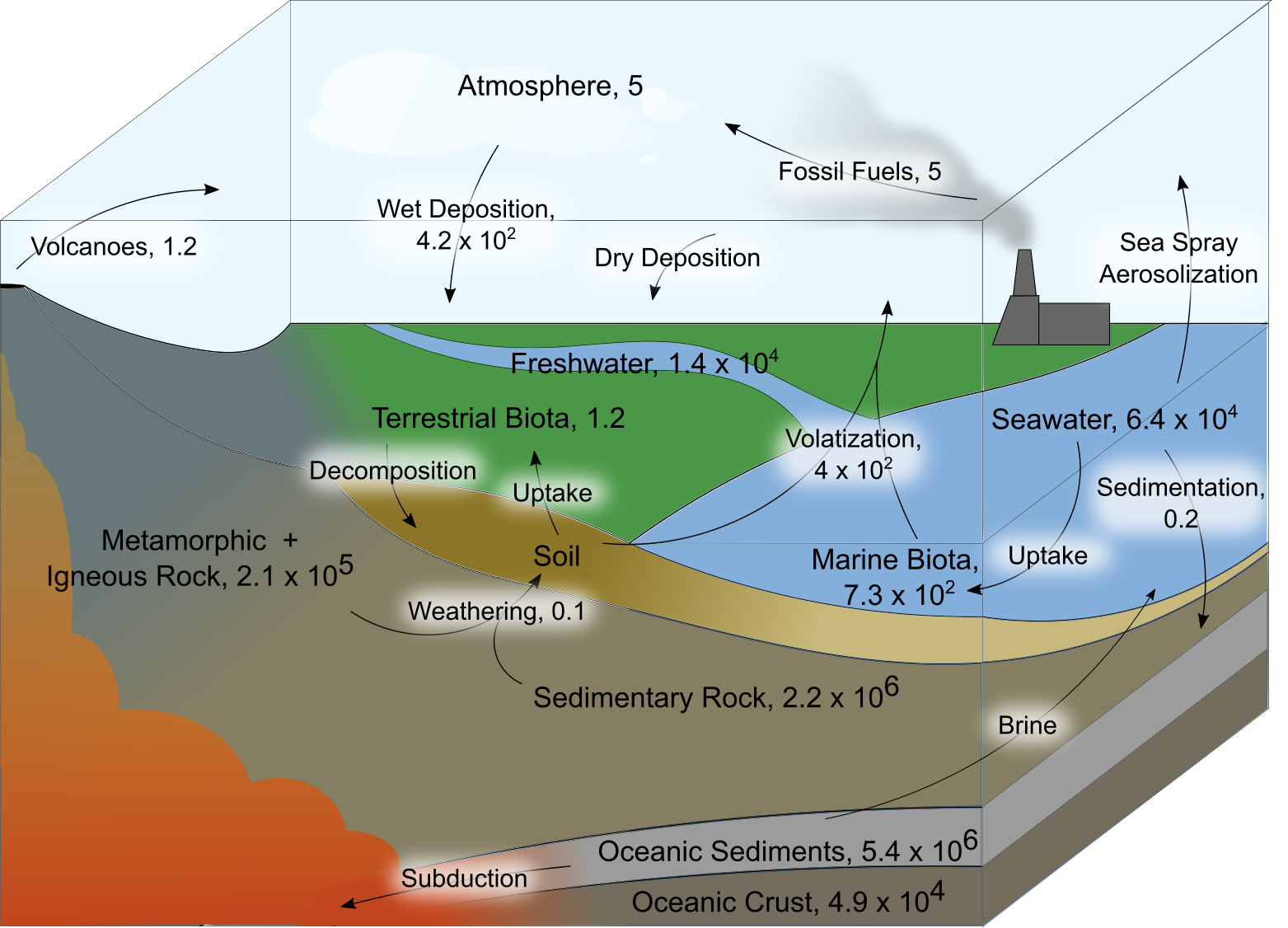
Iodine cycle diagram showing how iodine is cycled through the ecosystem, including living organisms. The figures all have units of teragrams (Tg).

Iodine is an essential trace element in biological systems. It has the distinction of being the heaviest element commonly needed by living organisms as well as the second-heaviest known to be used by any form of life (only tungsten, a component of a few bacterial enzymes, has a higher atomic number and atomic weight). It is a component of biochemical pathways in organisms from all biological kingdoms, suggesting its fundamental significance throughout the evolutionary history of life.

Iodine is critical to the proper functioning of the vertebrate endocrine system, and plays smaller roles in numerous other organs, including those of the digestive and reproductive systems. An adequate intake of iodine-containing compounds is important at all stages of development, especially during the fetal and neonatal periods, and diets deficient in iodine can present serious consequences for growth and metabolism.

== Vertebrate functions ==
=== Thyroid ===
In vertebrate biology, iodine's primary function is as a constituent of the thyroid hormones, thyroxine (T4) and triiodothyronine (T3). These molecules are made from addition-condensation products of the amino acid tyrosine, and are stored prior to release in an iodine-containing protein called thyroglobulin. T4 and T3 contain four and three atoms of iodine per molecule, respectively; iodine accounts for 65% of the molecular weight of T4 and 59% of T3. The thyroid gland actively absorbs iodine from the blood to produce and release these hormones into the blood, actions which are regulated by a second hormone, called thyroid-stimulating hormone (TSH), which is produced by the pituitary gland. Thyroid hormones are phylogenetically very old molecules which are synthesized by most multicellular organisms, and which even have some effect on unicellular organisms. Thyroid hormones play a fundamental role in biology, acting upon gene transcription mechanisms to regulate the basal metabolic rate. T3 acts on small intestine cells and adipocytes to increase carbohydrate absorption and fatty acid release, respectively. A deficiency of thyroid hormones can reduce basal metabolic rate up to 50%, while an excessive production of thyroid hormones can increase the basal metabolic rate by 100%. T4 acts largely as a precursor to T3, which is (with minor exceptions) the biologically active hormone. Via the thyroid hormones, iodine has a nutritional relationship with selenium. A family of selenium-dependent enzymes called deiodinases converts T4 to T3 (the active hormone) by removing an iodine atom from the outer tyrosine ring. These enzymes also convert T4 to reverse T3 (rT3) by removing an inner ring iodine atom, and also convert T3 to 3,3'-Diiodothyronine (T2) by removing an inner ring atom. Both of the latter products are inactivated hormones which have essentially no biological effects and are quickly prepared for disposal. A family of non-selenium-dependent enzymes then further deiodinates the products of these reactions.

The total amount of iodine in the human body is still controversial, and in 2001, M.T. Hays published in Thyroid that "it is surprising that the total iodine content of the human body remains uncertain after many years of interest in iodine metabolism. Only the iodine content of the thyroid gland has been measured accurately by fluorescent scanning, and it is now well estimate of 5–15 mg in the normal human thyroid. But similar methods are not available for other tissues and for the extrathyroidal organs. Many researchers reported different numbers of 10–50 mg of the total iodine content in human body". Selenium also plays a very important role in the production of glutathione, the body's most powerful antioxidant. During the production of the thyroid hormones, hydrogen peroxide is produced in large quantities, and therefore high iodine in the absence of selenium can destroy the thyroid gland (often described as a sore throat feeling); the peroxides are neutralized through the production of glutathione from selenium. In turn, an excess of selenium increases demand for iodine, and deficiency will result when a diet is high in selenium and low in iodine.

=== Extrathyroidal iodine ===
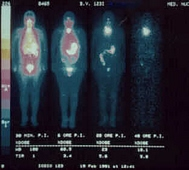
Sequence of 123-iodide human scintiscans after an intravenous injection, (from left) after 30 minutes, 20 hours, and 48 hours. A high and rapid concentration of radio-iodide is evident in extrathyroidal organs like cerebrospinal fluid (left), gastric and oral mucosa, salivary glands, arterial walls, ovary and thymus. In the thyroid gland, I-concentration is more progressive, as in a reservoir (from 1% after 30 minutes, and after 6, 20 h, to 5.8% after 48 hours, of the total injected dose).

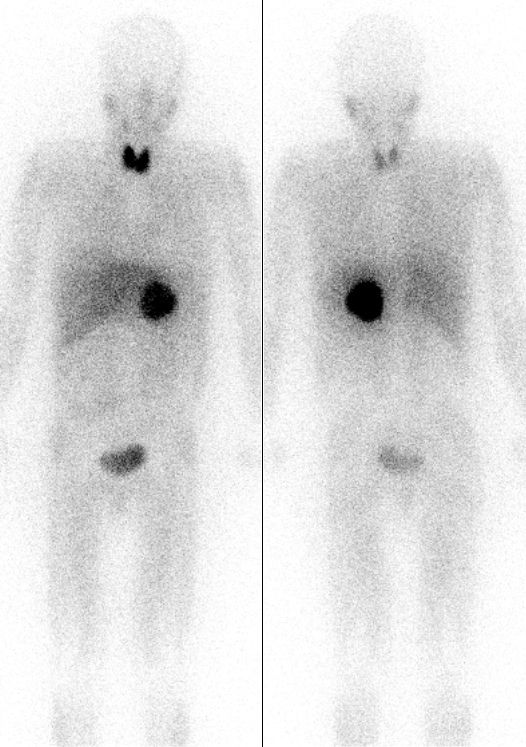
A pheochromocytoma tumor is seen as a dark sphere in the center of the body (it is in the left adrenal gland). The image is by MIBG scintigraphy, showing the tumor by radiation from radioiodine in the MIBG. Two images are seen of the same patient from front and back. The image of the thyroid in the neck is due to unwanted uptake of radioiodine from a radioactive iodine-containing medication by the thyroid gland in the neck. Accumulation at the sides of the head is from salivary gland uptake of iodide. Radioactivity is also seen from uptake by the liver, and excretion and accumulation in the bladder.

Extra-thyroidal iodine exists in several other organs, including the mammary glands, eyes, gastric mucosa, cervix, cerebrospinal fluid, arterial walls, ovary and salivary glands. In the cells of these tissues the iodide ion (I^{−}) enters directly by the sodium-iodide symporter (NIS). Different tissue responses for iodine and iodide occur in the mammary glands and the thyroid gland of rats. The role of iodine in mammary tissue is related to fetal and neonatal development, but its role in the other tissues is not well known. It has been shown to act as an antioxidant and antiproliferant in various tissues that can uptake iodine. Molecular iodine (I_{2}) has been shown to have a suppressive effect on benign and cancerous neoplasias.

The U.S. Food and Nutrition Board and Institute of Medicine recommended daily allowance of iodine ranges from 150 micrograms per day for adult humans to 290 micrograms per day for lactating mothers. However, the thyroid gland needs no more than 70 micrograms per day to synthesize the requisite daily amounts of T4 and T3. The higher recommended daily allowance levels of iodine seem necessary for optimal function of a number of other body systems, including lactating breasts, gastric mucosa, salivary glands, oral mucosa, arterial walls, thymus, epidermis, choroid plexus and cerebrospinal fluid, among others.

=== Other functions ===
Iodine and thyroxine have also been shown to stimulate the spectacular apoptosis of the cells of the larval gills, tail and fins during metamorphosis in amphibians, as well as the transformation of their nervous system from that of the aquatic, herbivorous tadpole into that of the terrestrial, carnivorous adult. The frog species Xenopus laevis has proven to be an ideal model organism for experimental study of the mechanisms of apoptosis and the role of iodine in developmental biology.

== Invertebrate functions ==
It is believed that thyroid hormones evolved in the Urbilaterian well before the development of the thyroid itself and molluscs, echinoderms, cephalochordates and ascidians all use such hormones. Cnidarians also respond to Thyroid hormone despite being parahoxozoans rather than bilaterians.

Insects can metabolise iodine. In addition, thyroid hormones can affect insect development, physiology, and life history. Some of their effects mimic those of two major hormones regulating insect metamorphosis, juvenile hormone and 20-hydroxyecdysone.

Phosphorylated tyrosines created with tyrosine kinases are fundamental signalling molecules in all animals and in choanoflagellates.

== Non-animal functions ==
Iodine is known to be crucial for life in many unicellular organisms. Phosphorylated tyrosines created with tyrosine kinases are fundamental signalling molecules in all animals and in choanoflagellates. and may be linked to the use of tyrosine–iodine compounds. Crockford proposes that iodine originally protected cell membranes from oxidative damage during photosynthesis. It may have later become involved in balancing cytoplasmic ion composition and in the non-enzymatic synthesis of tyrosine in early life.

It is common across all domains of life and uses tyrosine bonded to iodine.

Plants, insects, zooplankton, and algae store iodine as mono-iodotyrosine (MIT), di-iodotyrosine (DIT), iodocarbons, or iodoproteins.

Many plants use thyroid like hormones for regulating growth.

Gut-inhabiting bacteria use iodine from host thyroid hormone.

Thyroid-like hormones may be linked to the development of multicellularity. Iodotyrosines are highly reactive with other molecules which may have made them important cell signaling molecules early in evolutionary history. They form spontaneously without need for enzymatic catalysts which may have contributed to their early adoption by organisms, although enzymes make the yields significantly higher.

The ease of reaction with water may explain why iodine is so common across cell signaling in all domains of life.

Many photosynthetic microbes are able to reduce inorganic iodate to iodide in their cell walls but much of it gets released into the environment rather than cytoplasm in compounds such as methyl iodide. Many sulfate-reducing microorganisms and Iron-oxidizing bacteria also reduce iodate to iodide as well as many facultative anaerobic organisms suggesting this may be ancestral among anaerobic organisms.

Kelp store large quantities of iodide primarily as iodotyrosines for unknown reasons.

Molecular iodine (I_{2}) is toxic to most single-celled organisms by disrupting the cell membrane however Alphaproteobacteria and Choanoflagellates are resistant. Organisms such as Escherichia coli are killed by molecular iodine but require iodine from host thyroid hormone, indicating that not all organisms that need iodine are resistant to the toxic effects of pure iodine.

== Dietary recommendations ==
The U.S. Institute of Medicine (IOM) updated Estimated Average Requirements (EARs) and Recommended Dietary Allowances (RDAs) for iodine in 2000. For people age 14 and up, the iodine RDA is 150 μg/day; the RDA for pregnant women is 220 μg/day and the RDA during lactation is 290 μg/day. For children aged 1–8 years, the RDA is 90 μg/day; for children aged 8–13 years, it is 130 μg/day. As a safety consideration, the IOM sets tolerable upper intake levels (ULs) for vitamins and minerals when evidence is sufficient. The UL for iodine for adults is 1,100 μg/day. This UL was assessed by analyzing the effect of supplementation on thyroid-stimulating hormone. Collectively, the EARs, RDAs, AIs and ULs are referred to as Dietary Reference Intakes (DRIs).

The European Food Safety Authority (EFSA) refers to the collective set of information as Dietary Reference Values, with Population Reference Intake (PRI) instead of RDA, and Average Requirement instead of EAR; AI and UL are defined the same as in the United States. For women and men ages 18 and older, the PRI for iodine is set at 150 μg/day; the PRI during pregnancy or lactation is 200 μg/day. For children aged 1–17 years, the PRI increases with age from 90 to 130 μg/day. These PRIs are comparable to the U.S. RDAs with the exception of that for lactation. The EFSA reviewed the same safety question and set its adult UL at 600 μg/day, which is a bit more than half the U.S. value. Notably, Japan reduced its adult iodine UL from 3,000 to 2,200 μg/day in 2010, but then increased it back to 3,000 μg/day in 2015.

As of 2000, the median observed intake of iodine from food in the United States was 240 to 300 μg/day for men and 190 to 210 μg/day for women. In Japan, consumption is much higher due to the frequent consumption of seaweed or kombu kelp. The average daily intake in Japan ranges from 1,000 to 3,000 μg/day; previous estimates suggested an average intake as high as 13,000 μg/day.

=== Labeling ===
For U.S. food and dietary supplement labeling purposes, the amount in a serving is expressed as a percent of Daily Value (%DV). For iodine specifically, 100% of the Daily Value is considered 150 μg, and this figure remained at 150 μg in the May 27, 2016 revision. A table of the old and new adult daily values is provided at Reference Daily Intake.

=== Food sources ===
Natural sources of iodine include many marine organisms, such as kelp and certain seafood products, as well as plants grown on iodine-rich soil. Iodized salt is fortified with iodine. According to a Food Fortification Initiative 2016 report, 130 countries have mandatory iodine fortification of salt and an additional 10 have voluntary fortification.

== Deficiency ==
Worldwide, iodine deficiency affects two billion people and is the leading preventable cause of intellectual disability. Mental disability is a result which occurs primarily when babies or small children are rendered hypothyroidic by a lack of dietary iodine (new hypothyroidism in adults may cause temporary mental slowing, but not permanent damage).

In areas where there is little iodine in the diet, typically remote inland areas and semi-arid equatorial climates where no marine foods are eaten, iodine deficiency also gives rise to hypothyroidism, the most serious symptoms of which are epidemic goitre (swelling of the thyroid gland), extreme fatigue, mental slowing, depression, weight gain, and low basal body temperatures.

The addition of iodine to table salt (so-called iodized salt) has largely eliminated the most severe consequences of iodine deficiency in wealthier nations, but deficiency remains a serious public health problem in the developing world. Iodine deficiency is also a problem in certain areas of Europe; in Germany, an estimated one billion dollars in healthcare costs is spent each year in combating and treating iodine deficiency.

=== Iodine and cancer risk ===
- Breast cancer. The mammary gland actively concentrates iodine into milk for the benefit of the developing infant, and may develop a goiter-like hyperplasia, sometimes manifesting as fibrocystic breast disease, when iodine level is low. Studies indicate that iodine deficiency, either dietary or pharmacologic, can lead to breast atypia and increased incidence of malignancy in animal models, while iodine treatment can reverse dysplasia, with elemental iodine (I_{2}) having been found to be more effective in reducing ductal hyperplasias and perilobular fibrosis in iodine-deficient rats than iodide (I^{−}). On the observation that Japanese women who consume iodine-rich seaweed have a relatively low rate of breast cancer, iodine is suggested as a protection against breast cancer. Iodine is known to induce apoptosis in breast cancer cells. Laboratory evidence has demonstrated an effect of iodine on breast cancer that is in part independent of thyroid function, with iodine inhibiting cancer through modulation of the estrogen pathway. Gene array profiling of the estrogen responsive breast cancer cell line shows that the combination of iodine and iodide alters gene expression and inhibits the estrogen response through up-regulating proteins involved in estrogen metabolism. Whether iodine/iodide will be useful as an adjuvant therapy in the pharmacologic manipulation of the estrogen pathway in women with breast cancer has not been determined clinically.
- Gastric cancer. Some researchers have found an epidemiologic correlation between iodine deficiency, iodine-deficient goitre, and gastric cancer; a decrease in the death incidence from stomach cancer after iodine-prophylaxis. In the proposed mechanism, the iodide ion functions in gastric mucosa as an antioxidant reducing species that detoxifies poisonous reactive oxygen species, such as hydrogen peroxide.

== Precautions and toxicity ==
=== Elemental iodine ===
Elemental iodine is an oxidizing irritant, and direct contact with skin can cause lesions, so iodine crystals should be handled with care. Solutions with high elemental iodine concentration such as tincture of iodine are capable of causing tissue damage if use for cleaning and antisepsis is prolonged. Although elemental iodine is used in the formulation of Lugol's solution, a common medical disinfectant, it becomes triiodide upon reacting with the potassium iodide used in the solution and is therefore non-toxic. Only a small amount of elemental iodine will dissolve in water, but triiodides are highly soluble; potassium iodide thus serves as a phase transfer catalyst in the tincture. This allows Lugol's iodine to be produced in strengths varying from 2% to 15% iodine.

Elemental iodine (I_{2}) is poisonous if taken orally in large amounts; 2–3 grams is a lethal dose for an adult human.

Iodine vapor is very irritating to the eye, to mucous membranes, and in the respiratory tract. Concentration of iodine in the air should not exceed 1 mg/m^{3} (eight-hour time-weighted average).

When mixed with ammonia and water, elemental iodine forms nitrogen triiodide, which is extremely shock-sensitive and can explode unexpectedly.

=== Iodide ion ===
Compared to the elemental form, potassium iodide has a median lethal dose (LD_{50}) that is relatively high in several animals: in rabbits, it is 10 g/kg; in rats, 14 g/kg, and in mice, 22 g/kg. The tolerable upper intake level for iodine as established by the Food and Nutrition Board is 1,100 μg/day for adults. The safe upper limit of consumption set by the Ministry of Health, Labor and Welfare in Japan is 3,000 μg/day.

The biological half-life of iodine differs between the various organs of the body, from 100 days in the thyroid, to 14 days in the kidneys and spleen, to 7 days in the reproductive organs. Typically the daily urinary elimination rate ranges from 100 to 200 μg/L in humans. However, the Japanese diet, high in iodine-rich kelp, contains 1,000 to 3,000 μg of iodine per day, and research indicates the body can readily eliminate excess iodine that is not needed for thyroid hormone production. The literature reports as much as 30,000 μg/L (30 mg/L) of iodine being safely excreted in the urine in a single day, with levels returning to the standard range in a couple of days, depending on seaweed intake. One study concluded the range of total body iodine content in males was 12.1 mg to 25.3 mg, with a mean of 14.6 mg. It is presumed that once thyroid-stimulating hormone is suppressed, the body simply eliminates excess iodine, and as a result, long-term supplementation with high doses of iodine has no additional effect once the body is replete with enough iodine. It is unknown if the thyroid gland is the rate-limiting factor in generating thyroid hormone from iodine and tyrosine, but assuming it is not, a short-term loading dose of one or two weeks at the tolerable upper intake level may quickly restore thyroid function in iodine-deficient patients.

Excessive iodine intake presents symptoms similar to those of iodine deficiency. Commonly encountered symptoms are abnormal growth of the thyroid gland and disorders in functioning, as well as in growth of the organism as a whole. Iodide toxicity is similar to (but not the same as) toxicity to ions of the other halogens, such as bromides or fluorides. Excess bromine and fluorine can prevent successful iodine uptake, storage and use in organisms, as both elements can selectively replace iodine biochemically.

Excess iodine may also be more cytotoxic in combination with selenium deficiency. Iodine supplementation in selenium-deficient populations is theoretically problematic, partly for this reason. Selenocysteine (abbreviated as Sec or U, in older publications also as Se-Cys) is the 21st proteinogenic amino acid, and is the root of iodide ion toxicity when there is a simultaneous insufficiency of biologically available selenium. Selenocysteine exists naturally in all kingdoms of life as a building block of selenoproteins.

=== Hypersensitivity reactions ===
Some people develop a hypersensitivity to compounds of iodine but there are no known cases of people being directly allergic to elemental iodine itself. Notable sensitivity reactions that have been observed in humans include:

- The application of tincture of iodine may cause a rash.
- Some cases of reaction to povidone-iodine (Betadine) have been documented to be a chemical burn.

Medical use of iodine compounds (i.e. as a contrast agent) can cause anaphylactic shock in highly sensitive patients, presumably due to sensitivity to the chemical carrier. Cases of sensitivity to iodine compounds should not be formally classified as iodine allergies, as this perpetuates the erroneous belief that it is the iodine to which patients react, rather than to the specific allergen. Sensitivity to iodine-containing compounds is rare but has a considerable effect given the extremely widespread use of iodine-based contrast media; however, the only adverse effect of contrast material that can convincingly be ascribed to free iodide is iodide mumps and other manifestations of iodism.

== See also ==
- Biology and pharmacology of chemical elements
- Calcium in biology
- Magnesium in biology
- Potassium in biology
- Selenium in biology
- Sodium in biology
