= Susan J. Crockford =

Canadian zoologist, author, and blogger

- Born: Susan Janet Crockford; 1954 (age 71–72)
- Education: University of British Columbia (B.Sc., 1976); University of Victoria (Ph.D., 2004)
- Known for: Blogging about polar bears
- Scientific career
- Fields: Archaeozoology; Zoogeography; Paleoecology; Domestication
- Workplaces: University of Victoria
- Thesis: Animal Domestication and Vertebrate Speciation: A Paradigm for the Origin of Species (2004)
- Doctoral advisor: Quentin Mackie
- Website: susancrockford.com

Susan Janet Crockford is a Canadian zoologist known for her research and publications on polar bears. From 2004 to 2019 she was an adjunct professor in Anthropology at the University of Victoria. Crockford has gained attention for her blog posts on polar bear biology, in which she argues that polar bears are not threatened by climate change.

== Early life and education ==
Crockford first gained her interest in the Arctic in elementary school, when she read about Inuit life and Arctic fauna. Her scientific interest in the Arctic was stoked when she received her first Alaskan Malamute at age eleven.

Crockford received her Bachelor of Science in Zoology at the University of British Columbia in 1976 and her doctorate in Interdisciplinary Studies from the University of Victoria in 2004. She chose to focus on speciation in mammals, with a focus on thyroid function.

== Career ==
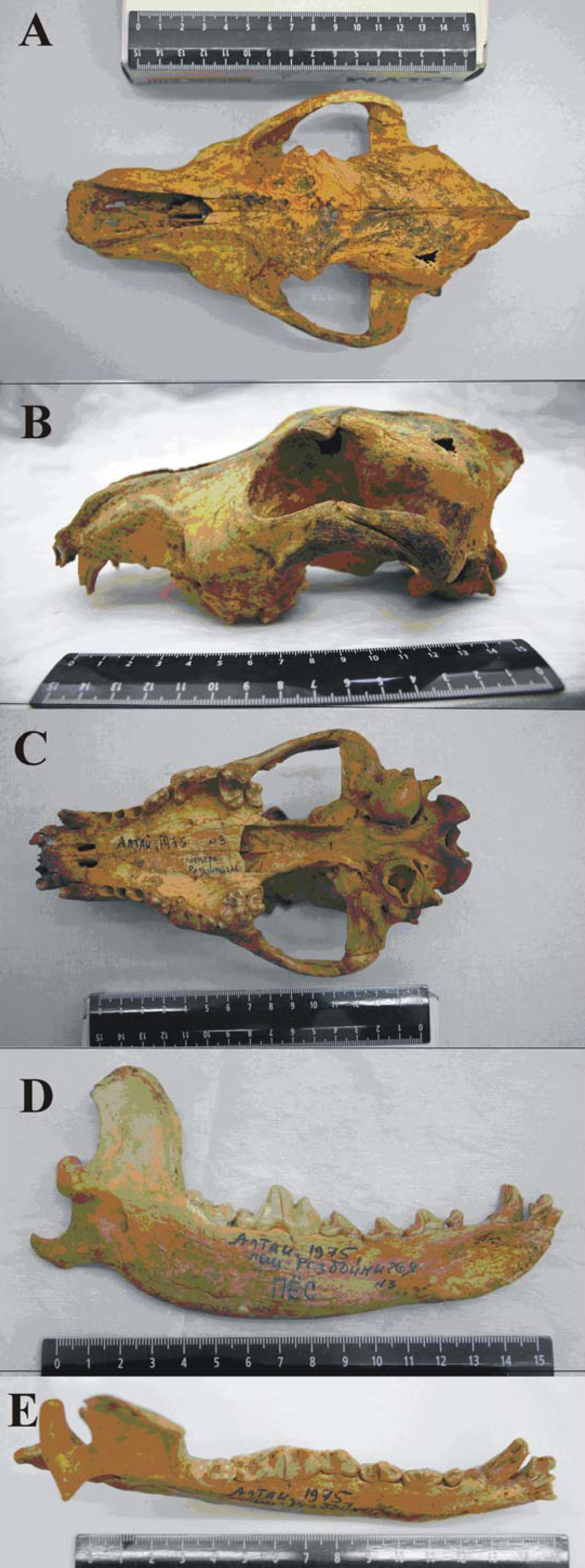
A 33,000 year old canid skull from Siberia analyzed by Pacific Identifications.

=== Business ===
In 1988, Crockford, along with colleagues Rebecca Wigen and Gay Frederick, founded the contracting company Pacific Identifications Inc. in Victoria. The company specializes in offering bone and shell analysis of skeletal elements of fish, mammals and birds from western North America and maintains a prominent library of reference animal remains.

=== Books ===
In 2006, she published the book Rhythms of Life: Thyroid Hormone and the Origin of Species, which asserted that "thyroid rhythms" are the sole cause of "virtually all significant evolutionarily significant differences in life history traits." She hypothesized that the thyroid is the key to controlling species-specific growth and for maintaining homeostatic conditions for individuals. Reviewing the book for The University of Chicago Press, Samantha J. Richardson noted that despite offering some "refreshing new" ideas, "no evidence is presented for the existence of these 'thyroid hormones,' " that "there are errors in the descriptions of molecular biology, biochemistry, and endocrinology," that some statements are "simply wrong" and "the references are not always accurate."

=== Dogs ===
Crockford has studied the evolutionary history of dogs, especially in regards to their domestication and speciation. In 2007, she was called upon as the scientific consultant for the PBS documentary, Dogs that Changed the World, focused upon the domestication of dogs. In the two-part documentary, she was called upon multiple times to give insight into the process of domestication and the emergence of dogs as a separate species from wolves. She has also written several peer-reviewed papers on this topic.

=== Polar bears ===
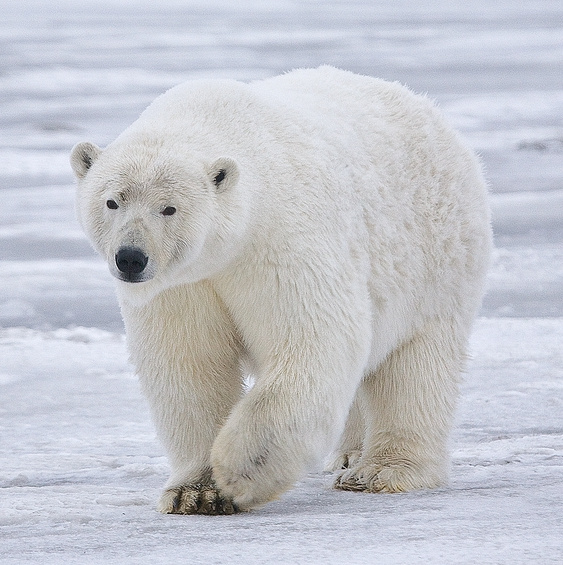
Crockford blogs about polar bears.

Although Crockford has not published peer-reviewed research on polar bears, she has challenged findings of widely recognized polar bear scientists, notably Steven Amstrup and Ian Stirling, stating that a 2015 paper by these researchers and others deliberately misrepresented data about polar bear population collapse. Two of the researchers responded to her claims with a rebuttal on the website Climate Feedback, to which she responded in her blog.

== Controversy ==
Crockford is a signatory of the International Conference on Climate Change's 2008 Manhattan Declaration, which states that "Carbon dioxide and other 'greenhouse gas' emissions from human activity...appear to have only a very small impact on global climate," and "Global cooling has presented serious problems for human society and the environment throughout history while global warming has generally been highly beneficial." Between at least 2011 and 2013, she received payment from The Heartland Institute, in the form of $750 per month, which Crockford states was to provide summaries of published papers that might not have been covered by the Intergovernmental Panel on Climate Change's Fifth Assessment Report. This payment has been construed as an undisclosed conflict of interest, by blogs such as Desmog Blog. Her response to such claims was a disclosure of the job description, how much she was paid, and the duration of the contract.

According to a 2018 study by Netherlands ecology professor Jeffrey Harvey and others, while Crockford has neither conducted any original research nor published any articles in the peer-reviewed literature on the effects of sea ice on the population dynamics of polar bears, her blog, Polar Bear Science, was a primary source used by websites that either deny or are skeptical of climate change, with over 80 percent citing it as their primary source of information on polar bears.

Crockford's unpaid adjunct professor position at the University of Victoria, which she held for 15 years, was not renewed when she came up for another term in May 2019. The University declined to give a reason.
