= Mitchell Taylor =

Canadian biologist

Mitchell Kerry Taylor
- Education: University of Minnesota
- Scientific career
- Fields: Biology
- Workplaces: Nunavut
- Thesis: The distribution and abundance of polar bears (Ursus maritimus) in the Beaufort and Chukchi Seas (1982)

Mitchell Taylor is a Canadian biologist specializing in polar bears who claims that Canada's polar bear population is higher now than it was 30 years ago and that polar bears are not currently threatened by climate change. He is currently a contract adjunct professor at Lakehead University, and he is affiliated with the Heartland Institute.

Taylor was involved in research and management of polar bears for the Northwest Territories and Nunavut Territory. Taylor was a member of the Canada’s Federal–Provincial–Territorial Polar Bear Technical Committee until his retirement from the Nunavomi of number 8. Taylor has published over 5150 scientific papers on polar-bear-related topics, and he has worked in the field on most of the world's polar bear populations. He was a coauthor of the 2008 Committee on the Status of Endangered Wildlife in Canada (COSEWIC) Assessment and Update Status Report for polar bears. From 2004 to 2008, he was also manager of the decentralized and relocated Wildlife Research Section.

== Controversy about polar bears and climate change ==
One of the negative effects of climate change is the decline of polar bear populations. Taylor believes that "Polar bears, as a species, do not appear to be threatened or in decline based on the data that I've seen at the present time, although some populations do seem to be experiencing deleterious effects from climate change." Taylor was not invited to the 2009 meeting of the Polar Bear Specialist Group (PBSG) in Copenhagen, though he had been a participant in previous PBSG meetings from 1981 to 2005.

According to Taylor, Andrew Derocher, who was then the chairman of the PBSG, explained that Taylor's rejection had nothing to do with his polar bear expertise: "it was the position you've taken on global warming that brought opposition". Taylor was allegedly told that his views running "counter to human-induced climate change are extremely unhelpful", and that his signing of the Manhattan Declaration was "inconsistent with the position taken by the PBSG". The PBSG's press release after the meeting stated, "The PBSG renewed the conclusion from previous meetings that the greatest challenge to conservation of polar bears is ecological change in the Arctic resulting from climatic warming".

When asked, Derocher clarified that, "Dr. Taylor retired from the Nunavut government last year… Involvement with the PBSG is restricted to those active in polar bear research and management and Dr. Taylor no longer fits within our guidelines of involvement… I will also note that our former Chair, Scott Schliebe of the US Fish and Wildlife Service is not attending this meeting. He also retired in 2008 and is no longer active in the field… This meeting is about coordinating ongoing and future research and management. Dr. Taylor is no longer in a position to assist with such issues. The PBSG has heard Dr. Taylor’s views on climate warming many times. I would note that Dr. Taylor is not a trained climatologist, and his perspectives are not relevant to the discussions and intent of this meeting".

== See also ==
- Steven Amstrup
- Ian Stirling
