= Polar bear conservation =

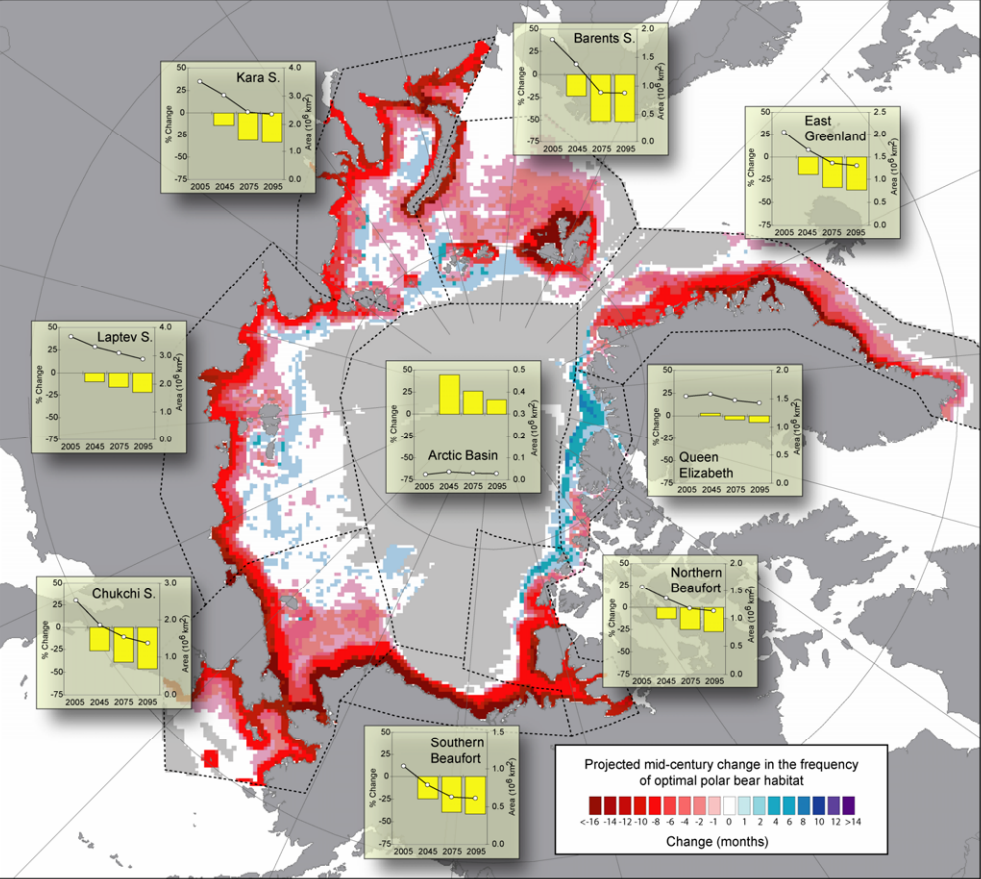
Map from the U.S. Geological Survey shows projected changes in polar bear habitat from 2001 to 2010 and 2043 to 2052. Red areas indicate loss of optimal polar bear habitat; blue areas indicate gain.

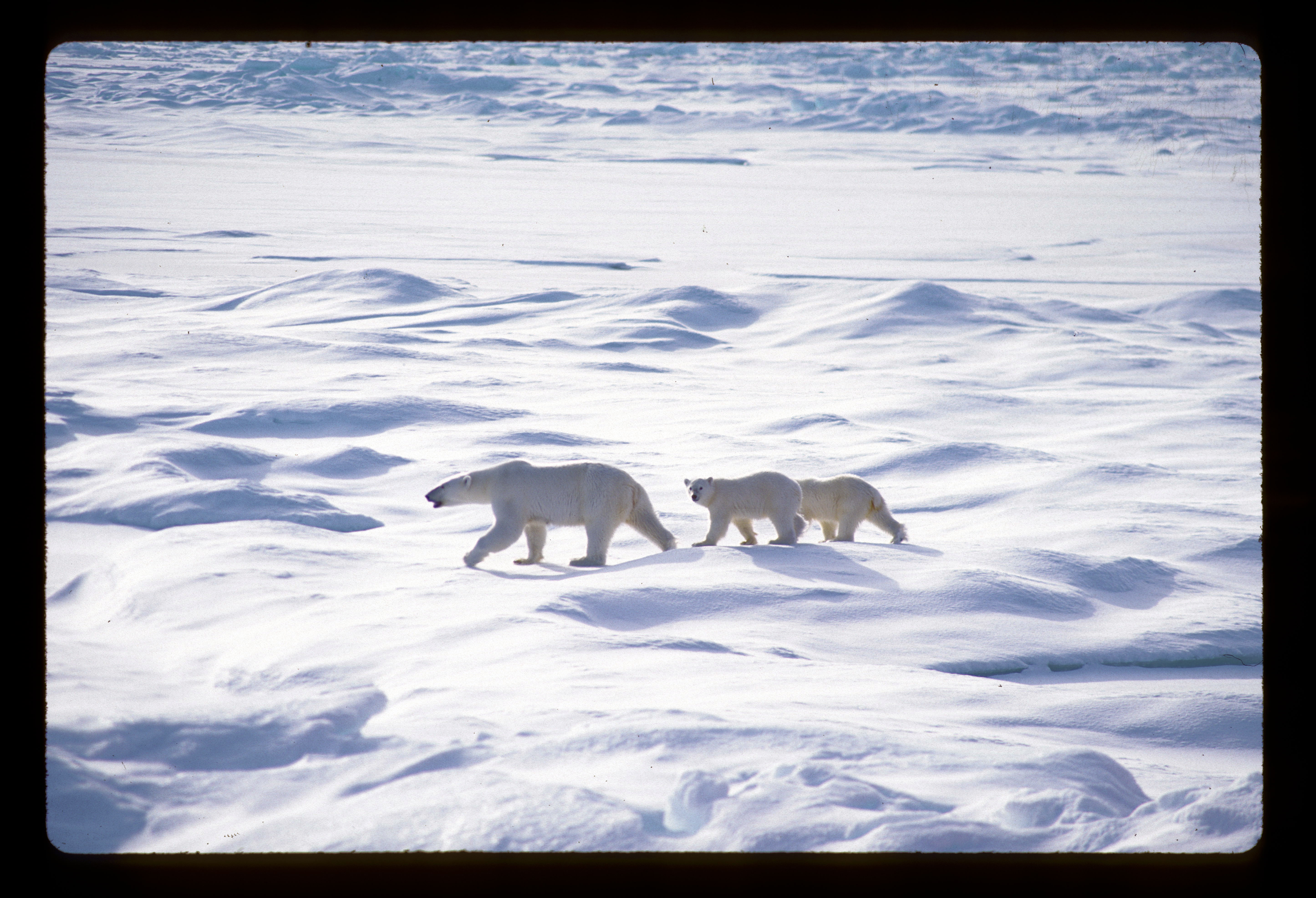
Polar Bear and Cubs

Polar bear population sizes and trends are difficult to estimate accurately because they occupy remote home ranges and exist at low population densities; however, population models based on diverse datasets can help scientists understand the dynamics. Polar bear fieldwork can also be hazardous to researchers. As of 2024, the International Union for Conservation of Nature (IUCN) reports that the global population of polar bears is 26,000, and the current population trend is unknown. Nevertheless, polar bears are listed as "Vulnerable" under criterion A3c, which indicates an expected population decrease of ≥30% over the next three generations (~34.5 years) due to "decline in area of occupancy, extent of occurrence and/or quality of habitat". Risks to the polar bear include climate change, pollution in the form of toxic contaminants, conflicts with shipping, oil and gas exploration and development, and human-bear interactions including harvesting for food and possible recreational polar-bear watching. Climate change is occurring at high rates, which is affecting the population of Polar Bears. Specifically in ecology, morphology, reproduction, and extinction risk.

According to the World Wildlife Fund, the polar bear is important as an indicator of Arctic ecosystem health. Polar bears are studied to gain understanding of what is happening throughout the Arctic, because at-risk polar bears are often a sign of something wrong with the Arctic marine ecosystem.

== Climate change ==
=== Nutrition ===
The key danger for polar bears posed by the effects of climate change is malnutrition or starvation due to habitat loss. Polar bears hunt seals from a platform of sea ice. Rising temperatures cause the sea ice to melt earlier in the year, driving the bears to shore before they have built sufficient fat reserves to survive the period of scarce food in the late summer and early fall. Reduction in sea-ice cover also forces bears to swim longer distances, which further depletes their energy stores and occasionally leads to drowning. Thinner sea ice tends to deform more easily, which appears to make it more difficult for polar bears to access seals. Insufficient nourishment leads to lower reproductive rates in adult females and lower survival rates in cubs and juvenile bears, in addition to poorer body condition in bears of all ages.

=== Reproduction ===
The International Union for Conservation of Nature, Arctic Climate Impact Assessment, United States Geological Survey and many leading polar bear biologists have expressed grave concerns about the impact of climate change, with some predicting extinction by 2102.

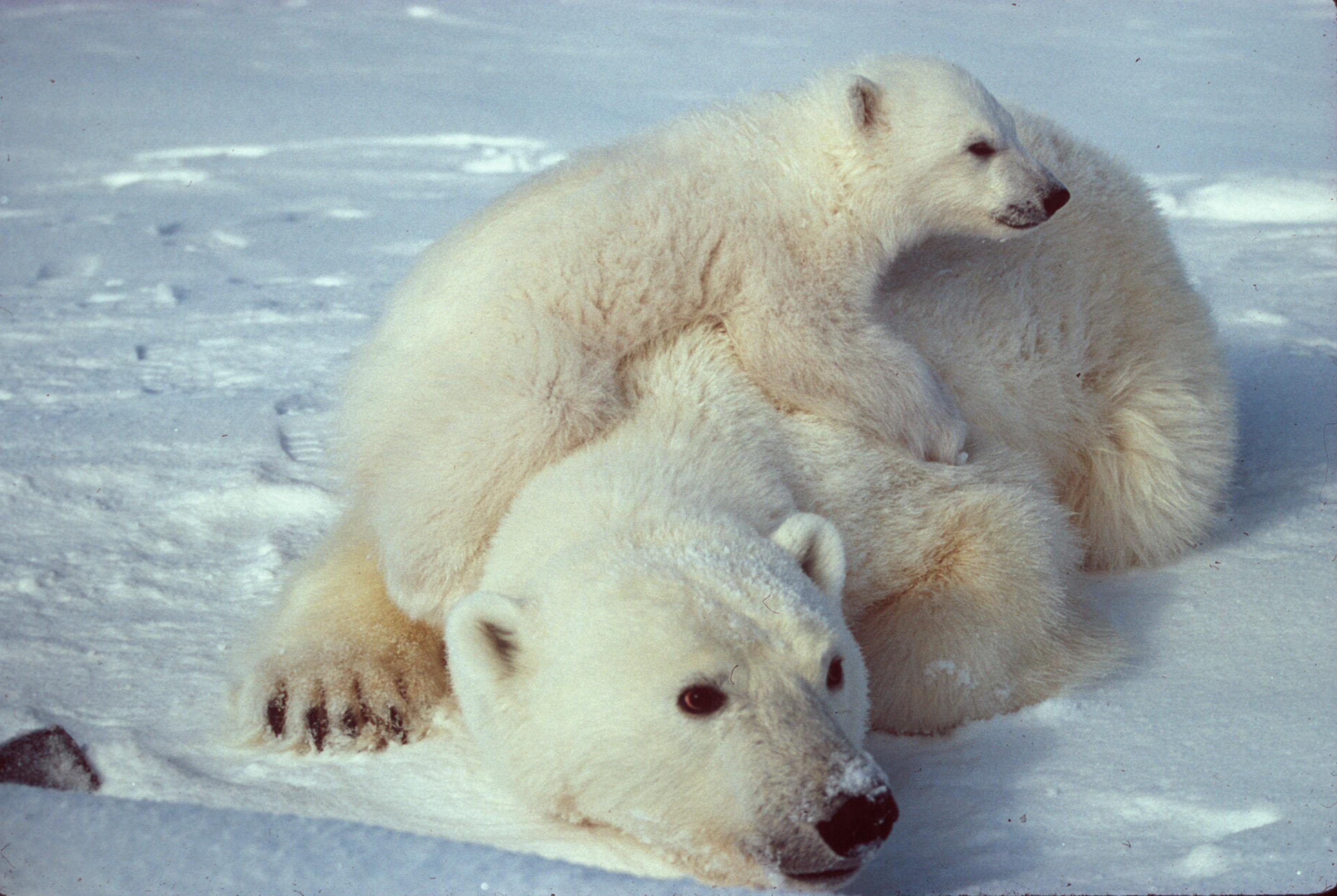
Mothers and cubs have high nutritional requirements, which are not met if the seal-hunting season is too short

In addition to creating nutritional stress, a warming climate is expected to affect various other aspects of polar bear life: changes in sea ice affect the ability of pregnant females to build suitable maternity dens. As the distance increases between the pack ice and the coast, females must swim longer distances to reach favoured denning areas on land. Thawing of permafrost would affect the bears who traditionally den underground, and warm winters could result in den roofs collapsing or having reduced insulative value. For the polar bears that currently den on multi-year ice, increased ice mobility may result in longer distances for mothers and young cubs to walk when they return to seal-hunting areas in the spring. Disease-causing bacteria and parasites would flourish more readily in a warmer climate.

With the ongoing changes in the climate, this has had overall effects on the female Polar Bears. Specifically population demography which is influenced by life history and the environment. Environmental factors, age, and body condition all play a role in successful reproduction in Polar Bears. For polar bears to remain pregnant, it requires a lot of energy investment. If female polar bears try to reproduce during times with low nutrient availability it can detrimental to their litter's health and their own health. Losing a litter can then decrease the chances of them being successfully reproductive. The reproduction process of polar bears can be delayed because polar bears mate between the months of March and June, but the egg doesn't implant until September or October. The most common litter's polar bears have are twins, and the mothers age is typically between 5 and 7. Polar bears over the age 30 aren't commonly seen pregnant due to aging. A study was done to evaluate trends in female polar bears to see specifically factors that contribute the most to pregnancy. This study was completed over 20 years, from 1991-2021. One important thing found, was that body mass played an important role on reproduction. The minimum mass required for pregnancy is 195–196 kg. Additional kg increase in mass increases the reproductive chance by 3.88%.

Problematic interactions between polar bears and humans, such as foraging by bears in garbage dumps, have historically been more prevalent in years when ice-floe breakup occurred early and local polar bears were relatively thin. Increased human-bear interactions, including fatal attacks on humans, are likely to increase as the sea ice shrinks and hungry bears try to find food on land.

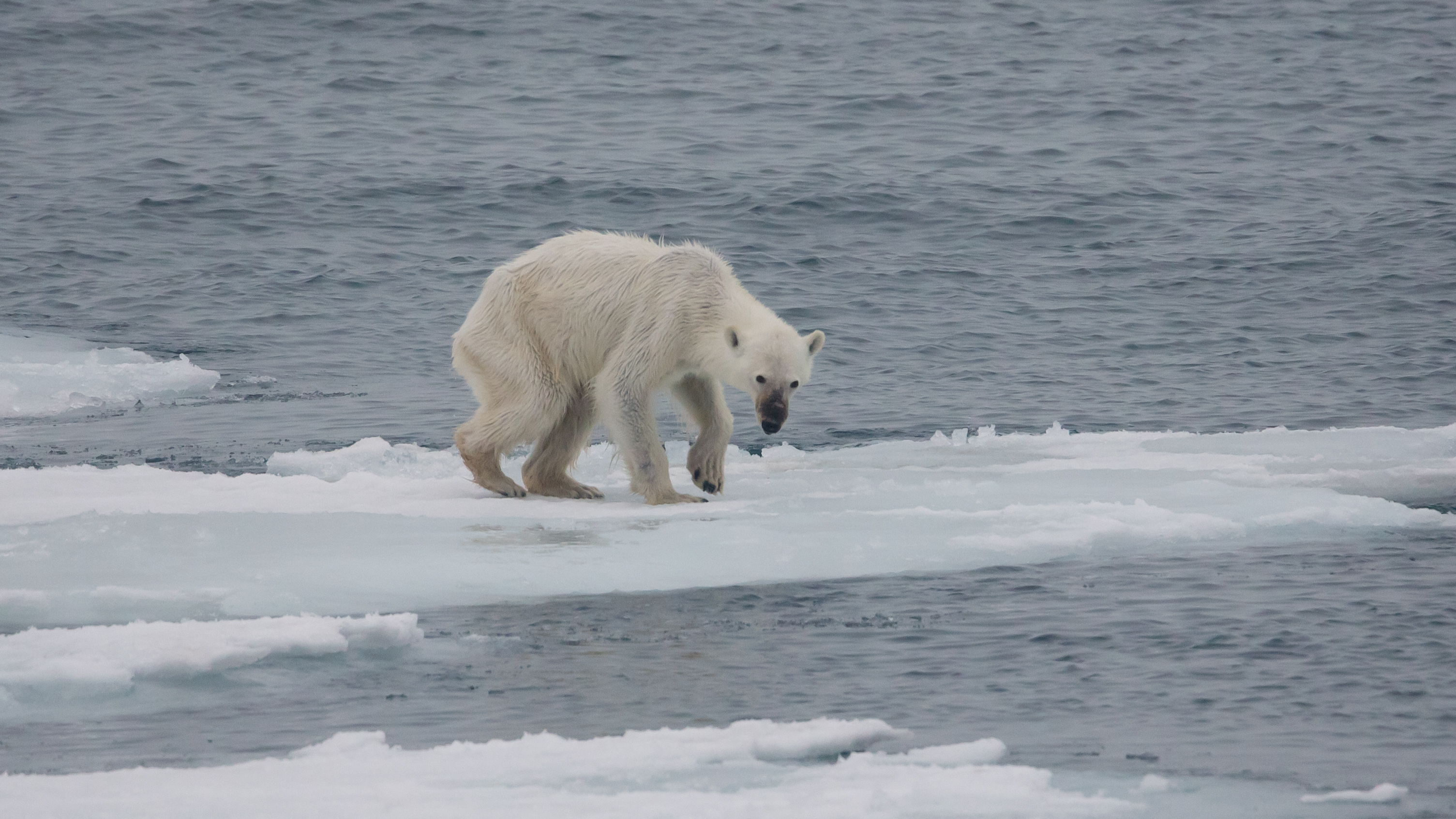
Starving bear near Svalbard

==== Western Hudson Bay(WHB) ====
Researchers analyzed long-term commonalities in Polar Bears that were pregnant. The study was done from 1991 to 2021, and then they compared data from 1982 to 1990. They hypothesized that pregnancy rates would be lower over time, which would be caused by the seal ice conditions and the availability of prey. Also, that older Polar Bears would have a harder time getting pregnant, and heavier bears would be able to get pregnant easier than bears that weighed less. Polar Bears were caught in Northeastern Canada, and used immobilization techniques. Researchers were able to capture 541 Polar Bears and collect data. The study was done during late summer to early autumn. Then again, in the spring to observe the pregnancies and litter loss. When the bears were captured, they collected blood samples from the femoral or jugular veins. Once the study was finished they found that there was a significant difference in weight for females older than five. The researches had four decades of data to analyze. They found that age and weight is an important factor for Polar Bears to get pregnant. Specifically, pregnant females were heavier than polar bears that were not pregnant. Although, polar bears that were not pregnant were much heavier than polar bears with yearlings, and polar bears with cubs. The meaning of this, is that heavier females are more likely to get pregnant, with a minimum weight of 196 kg. When analyzing pregnancy rates of the decades, it has declined. The researchers found that Sea Ice metrics did not have an effect on pregnancy rates. Lastly, food availability and body condition were the prominent factors in Polar Bears being able to reproduce.

The effects of climate change are most profound in the southern part of the polar bear's range, and this is indeed where significant degradation of local populations has been observed. The Western Hudson Bay subpopulation, in a southern part of the range, also happens to be one of the best-studied polar bear subpopulations. This subpopulation feeds heavily on ringed seals in late spring, when newly weaned and easily hunted seal pups are abundant. The late spring hunting season ends for polar bears when the ice begins to melt and break up, and they fast or eat little during the summer until the sea freezes again.

Due to warming air temperatures, ice-floe breakup in western Hudson Bay is currently occurring three weeks earlier than it did 30 years ago, reducing the duration of the polar bear feeding season. The body condition of polar bears has declined during this period; the average weight of lone (and likely pregnant) female polar bears was approximately 290 kg (640 lb) in 1980 and 230 kg (510 lb) in 2004. Between 1987 and 2004, the Western Hudson Bay population declined by 22%, as of 2021, the population has "very likely decreased". As the climate change melts sea ice, the U.S. Geological Survey projects that two-thirds of polar bears will disappear by 2052.

In Alaska, the effects of sea ice shrinkage have contributed to higher mortality rates in polar bear cubs, and have led to changes in the denning locations of pregnant females. The proportion of maternity dens on sea ice has changed from 62% between the years 1985 through 1994, to 37% over the years 1998 through 2004. Thus, now the Alaskan population more resembles the world population in that it is more likely to den on land. In recent years, polar bears in the Arctic have undertaken longer than usual swims to find prey, possibly resulting in four recorded drownings in the unusually large ice pack regression of 2005.

A new development is that polar bears have begun ranging to new territory. While not unheard of but still uncommon, polar bears have been sighted increasingly in larger numbers ashore, staying on the mainland for longer periods of time during the summer months, particularly in North Canada, traveling farther inland. This may cause an increased reliance on terrestrial diets, such as goose eggs, waterfowl and caribou, as well as increased human–bear conflict.

== Evolution ==
Polar Bears are a symbol of the threat climate change has to the world's biodiversity and evolution. Researchers recovered a genome of a 130,000-150,000 year old polar bear. This bear was uncovered from Svalbard Archipelago. Polar Bears depend on the Sea Ice to survive and they need it to continue their future stability. Using this ancient genome, researchers hoped it would help provide insights on polar bear's has adaptive resilience to past environmental extremes. They compared the ancient genomes with the new genomes of polar bears and brown bears. Researchers used a 10x coverage genome sequence of the ancient and 10 of the new. What they found is due to climate change black bears and brown bears are migrating more towards the North into polar bear territory. This can cause an increase in the overlap between those species. This also may cause competition and hybridization. From those genomes they found that ancient polar bears hybridized a lot. Hybridizations allows for genetic variation and evolutionary change. Researchers believe it will be small compared to the sea ice shrinking and habitat loss.

Researchers also predict that the decreasing of sea ice in the Arctic will isolate the polar bear populations. Even though, other bear populations will be migrating, they will be cut off from other populations. This will have great effects on the polar bear population, including a decrease in genetic diversity and inbreeding can occur. Since climate change is happening faster today then in the past, it might not give polar bears enough time to have evolutionary responses.

=== Predictions ===
Steven Amstrup and other U.S. Geological Survey scientists have predicted two-thirds of the world's polar bears may disappear by 2051, based on moderate projections for the shrinking of summer sea ice caused by climate change, though the validity of this study has been debated. The bears could disappear from Europe, Asia, and Alaska, and be depleted from the Canadian Arctic Archipelago and areas off the northern Greenland coast. By 2081, they could disappear from Greenland entirely and from the northern Canadian coast, leaving only dwindling numbers in the interior Arctic Archipelago. However, in the short term, some polar bear populations in historically colder regions of the Arctic may temporarily benefit from a milder climate, as multiyear ice that is too thick for seals to create breathing holes is replaced by thinner annual ice.

Polar bears diverged from brown bears 400,000–600,000 years ago and have survived past periods of climate fluctuation. It has been claimed that polar bears will be able to adapt to terrestrial food sources as the sea ice they use to hunt seals disappears. However, most polar bear biologists think that polar bears will be unable to completely offset the loss of calorie-rich seal blubber with terrestrial foods, and that they will be outcompeted by brown bears in this terrestrial niche, ultimately leading to a population decline.

=== Increasing Land Use ===
Since the Arctic sea is decreasing, it's pushing Polar bears to live on the land more. Researchers believe because of this, they are forced to minimize their activity to preserve energy. Having successful reproduction and individual survival, energy is the main factor. A study was done from 2019-2022 in the months of August to September on 20 Polar Bears. This study was performed in Manitoba, Canada. Their goal was to gain information on their daily energy expenditure (DEE), diet, behavior, movement and body position.

The researchers classified adult Polar Bears as five years and older, subadults were between the ages of two and four. Blood samples were taken, measured initial oxygen-18 and denatured water. Also measured respiratory exchange, and serum progesterone levels of females.They then put the bears back and recaptured them 19–23 days after. Once captured they analyzed the same things to compare the initial and final data. The researchers were able to find a lot. First, DEE varied a 5-fold across all the polar bears and a 4-fold with adult bears. There was high activity on the sea ice and lower activity on land. They also found that Polar Bears are able to suppress their metabolism to levels of when they are in hibernation. Although some bears were found to increase their foraging, and activity. The percentage of body fat taken compared to daily energy expenditure did not have any correlation. Researchers say this shows a high individual level of behavioral variation. When the researchers looked at food ate, berries were their highest food source. Although, berries don't provide a high benefit for energy, but is inexpensive to the polar bears. Three polar bears were found to spend 10-16% more time swimming compared to others. These polar bears had the highest DEE, earlier starvation times, and most active in age and sex. Overall, the researchers predict that standing on land more, will increase starvation risk, lower their energy reserves, and decline reproduction success.

== Pollution ==
Polar bears accumulate high levels of persistent organic pollutants such as polychlorinated biphenyl (PCBs) and chlorinated pesticides. Mainly, PCBs are introduced to the Artic by means of long distance travel. Primary resources and secondary resources are the principle means of transportation. Primary sources can include things like waste dumps and decommissioning sites and secondary resources can include emissions of PCBs that are accumulated in environmental reservoirs.. Due to their position at the top of the ecological pyramid, with a diet heavy in blubber in which halocarbons concentrate, their bodies are among the most contaminated of Arctic mammals. Halocarbons (also known as organohalogens) are known to be toxic to other animals, because they mimic hormone chemistry, and biomarkers such as immunoglobulin G and retinol suggest similar effects on polar bears. PCBs have received the most study, and they have been associated with birth defects and immune system deficiency.

Many chemicals, such as PCBs and DDT, have been internationally banned due to the recognition of their harm on the environment. Ever since that ban, PCB levels among the atmosphere in the Artic have steadily declined over the recent few decades. This steady decline can likely be traced back to the international ban on PCBs . As studies performed from 1989 to 1993 and studies performed from 1996 to 2002 show. During the same time periods, DDT was found to be notably lower in the Western Hudson Bay population only.

== Oil and gas development ==
The development of oil and gas in Northern Alaska has been occurring for more than 40 years. The majority of this development has occurred between the National Petroleum Reserve-Alaska and the Artic National Wildlife Refuge (ANWR). In 2017, the United States allowed for the oil and gas development to take place inside the costal plain of the Artic National Wildlife Refuge. The ANWR is home to important habitat for polar bears. Oil and gas development in these polar bear habitats can affect the bears in a variety of ways. An oil spill in the Arctic would most likely concentrate in the areas where polar bears and their prey are also concentrated, such as sea ice leads. Because polar bears rely partly on their fur for insulation and thermoregulation, soiling of the fur by oil reduces its insulative value which means that oil spills put bears at risk of dying from hypothermia. Polar bears exposed to oil spill conditions have been observed to lick the oil from their fur, leading to fatal kidney failure. Maternity dens, used by pregnant females and by females with infants, can also be disturbed by nearby oil exploration and development. Disturbance of these sensitive sites may trigger the mother to abandon her den prematurely, or abandon her litter altogether. Overall, the ability to capture polar bears that are exposed to oil and how effective it is remains undeveloped.

== Harvesting ==
In Russia, polar bear furs were already being commercially traded in the 14th century, though it was of low value compared to Arctic fox or even reindeer fur. The growth of the human population in the Eurasian Arctic in the 16th and 17th century, together with the advent of firearms and increasing trade, dramatically increased the harvest of polar bears. However, since polar bear fur has always played a marginal commercial role, data on the historical harvest is fragmentary. It is known, for example, that already in the winter of 1784/1785 Russian Pomors on Spitsbergen harvested 150 polar bears in Magdalenefjorden. In the early 20th century, Norwegian hunters were harvesting 300 bears per year at the same location. Estimates of total historical harvest suggest that from the beginning of the 18th century, roughly 400 to 500 animals were being harvested annually in northern Eurasia, reaching a peak of 1,300 to 1,500 animals in the early 20th century, and falling off as the numbers began dwindling. In relations to polar bears, subsistence hunting has cultural, nutritional, and economical value to native people who live in the Artic. Traditional subsistence hunting was on a small enough scale to not significantly affect polar bear populations, mostly because of the sparseness of the human population in polar bear habitat. Due to the sparse human population, the harvest is a direct and controllable source of mortality.

In the first half of the 20th century, mechanized and overpoweringly efficient methods of hunting and trapping came into use in North America as well. Polar bears were chased from snowmobiles, icebreakers, and airplanes, the latter practice described in a 1965 New York Times editorial as being "about as sporting as machine gunning a cow." Norwegians used "self-killing guns", comprising a loaded rifle in a baited box that was placed at the level of a bear's head, and which fired when the string attached to the bait was pulled. The numbers taken grew rapidly in the 1960s, peaking around 1968 with a global total of 1,250 bears that year.

For sub populations of polar bears, the effect could be different. Interactions between climate change and human caused removals could have a more detrimental effect to populations of certain polar bears. Habitat loss could make polar bears more vulnerable to over hunting which would cause populations to decline. Female polar bears tend to have a population growth than males. If females are harvested at a higher rate then that could cause the harvest to be classified as biologically not sustainable. This would ultimately end in polar bear subpopulation to decline.

=== Contemporary regulations ===
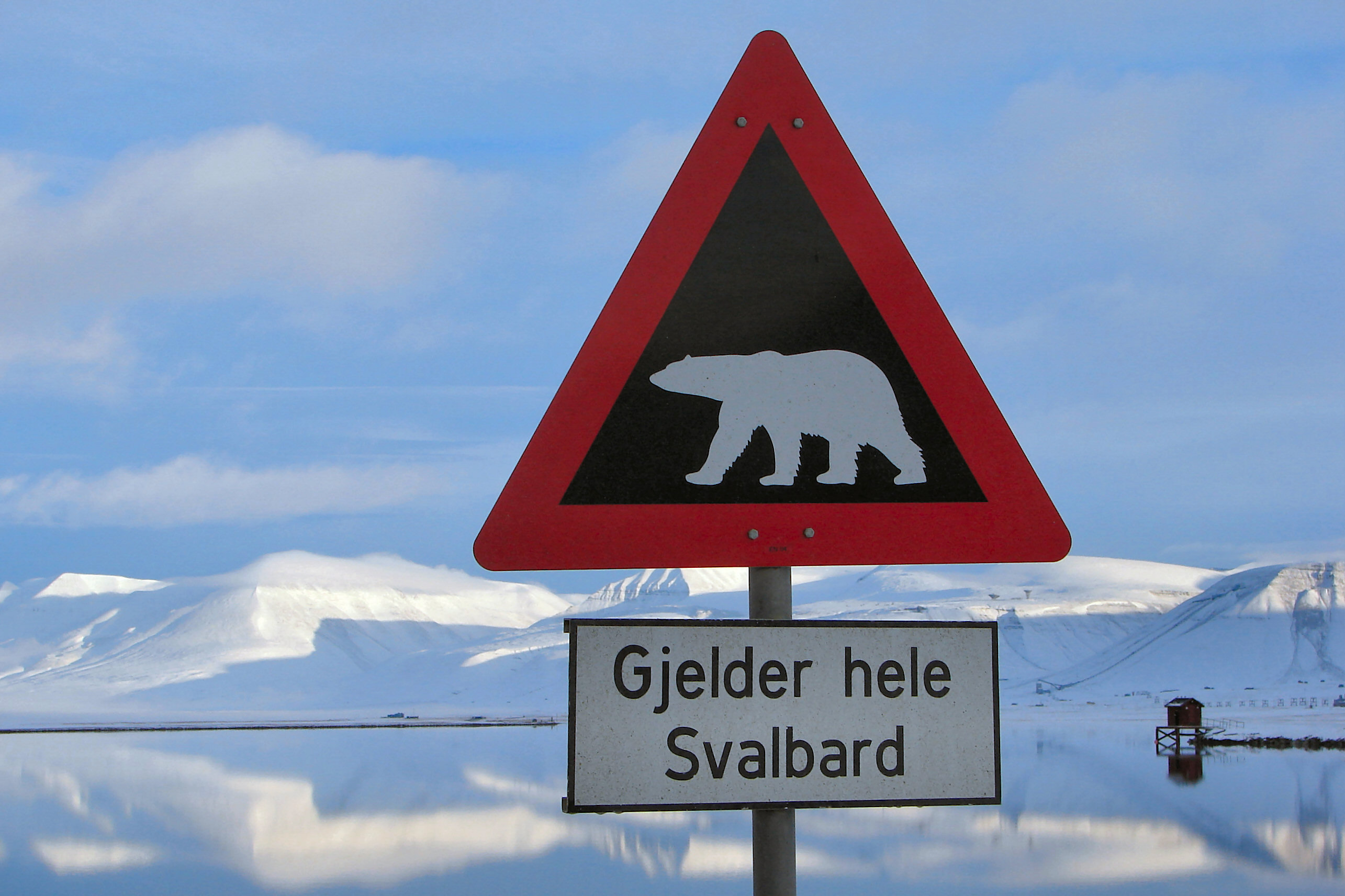
Road sign warning about the presence of bears. The Norwegian text translates into "Applies to all of Svalbard".

Concerns over the future survival of the species led to the development of national regulations on polar bear hunting, beginning in the mid-1950s. The Soviet Union banned all hunting in 1956. Canada began imposing hunting quotas in 1968. Norway passed a series of increasingly strict regulations from 1965 to 1973, and has completely banned hunting since then. The United States began regulating hunting in 1971 and adopted the Marine Mammal Protection Act in 1972. In 1973, the International Agreement on the Conservation of Polar Bears was signed by all five nations whose territory is inhabited by polar bears: Canada, Denmark, Norway, the Soviet Union, and the United States. Member countries agreed to place restrictions on recreational and commercial hunting, ban hunting from aircraft and icebreakers, and conduct further research. The treaty allows hunting "by local people using traditional methods". Norway is the only country of the five in which all harvest of polar bears is banned. The agreement was a rare case of international cooperation during the Cold War. Biologist Ian Stirling commented, "For many years, the conservation of polar bears was the only subject in the entire Arctic that nations from both sides of the Iron Curtain could agree upon sufficiently to sign an agreement. Such was the intensity of human fascination with this magnificent predator, the only marine bear."

Agreements have been made between countries to co-manage their shared polar bear subpopulations. After several years of negotiations, Russia and the United States signed an agreement in October 2000 to jointly set quotas for indigenous subsistence hunting in Alaska and Chukotka. The treaty was ratified in October 2007. In September 2015, the polar bear range states agreed upon a "circumpolar action plan" describing their conservation strategy for polar bears.

The species is listed in Appendix II of the Convention on International Trade in Endangered Species (CITES) meaning international trade, including in parts or derivatives, is controlled by the CITES system of permits and certificates. The United States government has proposed that polar bears be transferred to Appendix I of CITES which would ban all commercial international trade in polar bear parts. The decision to leave the species listed under Appendix II was endorsed by the IUCN and TRAFFIC, who determined that such an uplisting was unlikely to confer a conservation benefit. WWF and PBI (Polar Bears International) also opposed the uplisting to Appendix 1 for polar bears. WWF’s position on polar bear trade has been the subject of public criticism and reporting regarding its role in CITES policy debates.

==== Canada ====
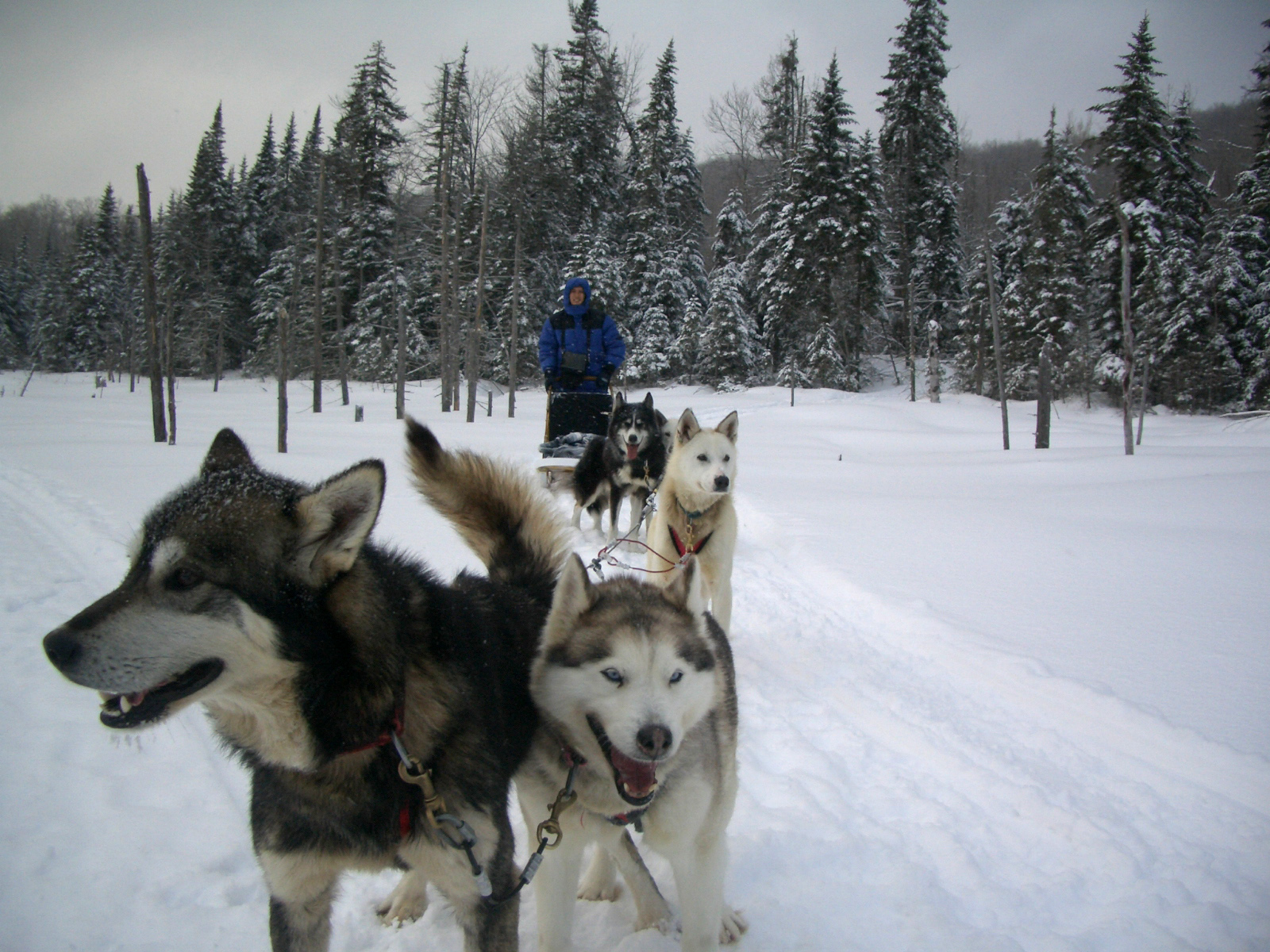
Dogsleds are used for recreational hunting of polar bears in Canada

Polar bears were designated "Not at Risk" in April 1986 and uplisted to "Special Concern" in April 1991. This status was re-evaluated and confirmed in April 1999, November 2002, and April 2008. Polar bears continue to be listed as a species of special concern in Canada because of their sensitivity to overharvest and because of an expected range contraction caused by loss of Arctic sea ice.

More than 900 bears are killed per year by humans across Canada, a rate calculated by scientists to be unsustainable for some areas, notably Baffin Bay. Canada has allowed sport hunters accompanied by local guides and dog-sled teams since 1970, but the practice was not common until the 1980s. The guiding of sport hunters provides meaningful employment and an important source of income for northern communities in which economic opportunities are few. Sport hunting can bring CDN$20,000 to $35,000 per bear into northern communities, which until recently has been mostly from American hunters.

The territory of Nunavut accounts for the location 80% of annual kills in Canada. In 2005, the government of Nunavut increased the quota from 400 to 518 bears, despite protests from the IUCN Polar Bear Specialist Group. In two areas where harvest levels have been increased based on increased sightings, science-based studies have indicated declining populations, and a third area is considered data-deficient. While most of that quota is hunted by the indigenous Inuit, a growing share is sold to recreational hunters. (0.8% in the 1970s, 7.1% in the 1980s, and 14.6% in the 1990s) Nunavut polar bear biologist, Mitchell Taylor, who was formerly responsible for polar bear conservation in the territory, has insisted that bear numbers are being sustained under current hunting limits. In 2010, the 2005 increase was partially reversed. Government of Nunavut officials announced that the polar bear quota for the Baffin Bay region would be gradually reduced from 105 per year to 65 by 2013. The Government of the Northwest Territories maintain their own quota of 72 to 103 bears within the Inuvialuit communities of which some are set aside for sports hunters. Environment Canada also banned the export from Canada of fur, claws, skulls and other products from polar bears harvested in Baffin Bay as of 1 January 2010.

Because of the way polar bear hunting quotas are managed in Canada, attempts to discourage sport hunting would actually increase the number of bears killed in the short term. Canada allocates a certain number of permits each year to sport and subsistence hunting, and those that are not used for sport hunting are re-allocated to indigenous subsistence hunting. Whereas northern communities kill all the polar bears they are permitted to take each year, only half of sport hunters with permits actually manage to kill a polar bear. If a sport hunter does not kill a polar bear before his or her permit expires, the permit cannot be transferred to another hunter.

In August 2011, Environment Canada published a national polar bear conservation strategy.

==== Greenland ====
In Greenland, hunting restrictions were first introduced in 1994 and expanded by executive order in 2005. Until 2005 Greenland placed no limit on hunting by indigenous people. However, in 2006 it imposed a limit of 150, while also allowed recreational hunting for the first time. Other provisions included year-round protection of cubs and mothers, restrictions on weapons used and various administrative requirements to catalogue kills.

==== Norway ====
Polar bears were hunted heavily in Svalbard, Norway throughout the 19th century and to as recently as 1973, when the conservation treaty was signed. 900 bears a year were harvested in the 1920s and after World War II, there were as many as 400–500 harvested annually. Some regulations of hunting did exist. In 1927, poisoning was outlawed while in 1939, certain denning sights were declared off limits. The killing of females and cubs was made illegal in 1965. Killing of polar bears decreased somewhat 25–30 years before the treaty. Despite this, the polar bear population continued to decline and by 1973, only around 1000 bears were left in Svalbard. Only with the passage of the treaty did they begin to recover.

==== Russia ====
The Soviet Union banned the harvest of polar bears in 1956; however, poaching continued, and is estimated to pose a serious threat to the polar bear population. In recent years, polar bears have approached coastal villages in Chukotka more frequently due to the shrinking of the sea ice, endangering humans and raising concerns that illegal hunting would become even more prevalent. In 2007, the Russian government made subsistence hunting legal for indigenous Chukotkan peoples only, a move supported by Russia's most prominent bear researchers and the World Wide Fund for Nature as a means to curb poaching.

Polar bears are currently listed as "Rare", of "Uncertain Status", or "Rehabilitated and rehabilitating" in the Red Data Book of Russia, depending on population. In 2010, the Ministry of Natural Resources and Environment published a strategy for polar bear conservation in Russia.

==== United States ====
Legal advocacy has also played a major role in polar bear conservation, as environmental groups used litigation to push for the species to be listed as "threatened," which required the government to protect their habitat and develop official climate-science reports. This legal action connected polar bear survival directly to climate-policy decisions and helped shape conservation strategies. Organizations like the World Wildlife Fund also highlight how policy choices and greenhouse-gas regulation are now central to long term polar bear protection.

The Marine Mammal Protection Act of 1972 afforded polar bears some protection in the United States. It banned hunting (except by indigenous subsistence hunters), banned importing of polar bear parts (except polar bear pelts taken legally in Canada), and banned the harassment of polar bears. On 15 May 2008, the United States Department of the Interior listed the polar bear as a threatened species under the Endangered Species Act, citing the melting of Arctic sea ice as the primary threat to the polar bear. It banned all importing of polar bear trophies. Importing products made from polar bears had been prohibited from 1972 to 1994 under the Marine Mammal Protection Act, and restricted between 1994 and 2008. Under those restrictions, permits from the United States Fish and Wildlife Service were required to import sport-hunted polar bear trophies taken in hunting expeditions in Canada. The permit process required that the bear be taken from an area with quotas based on sound management principles. Since 1994, hundreds of sport-hunted polar bear trophies have been imported into the U.S. In 2015, the U.S. Fish and Wildlife Service published a draft conservation management plan for polar bears to improve their status under the Endangered Species Act and the Marine Mammal Protection Act.

== Controversy over species protection ==
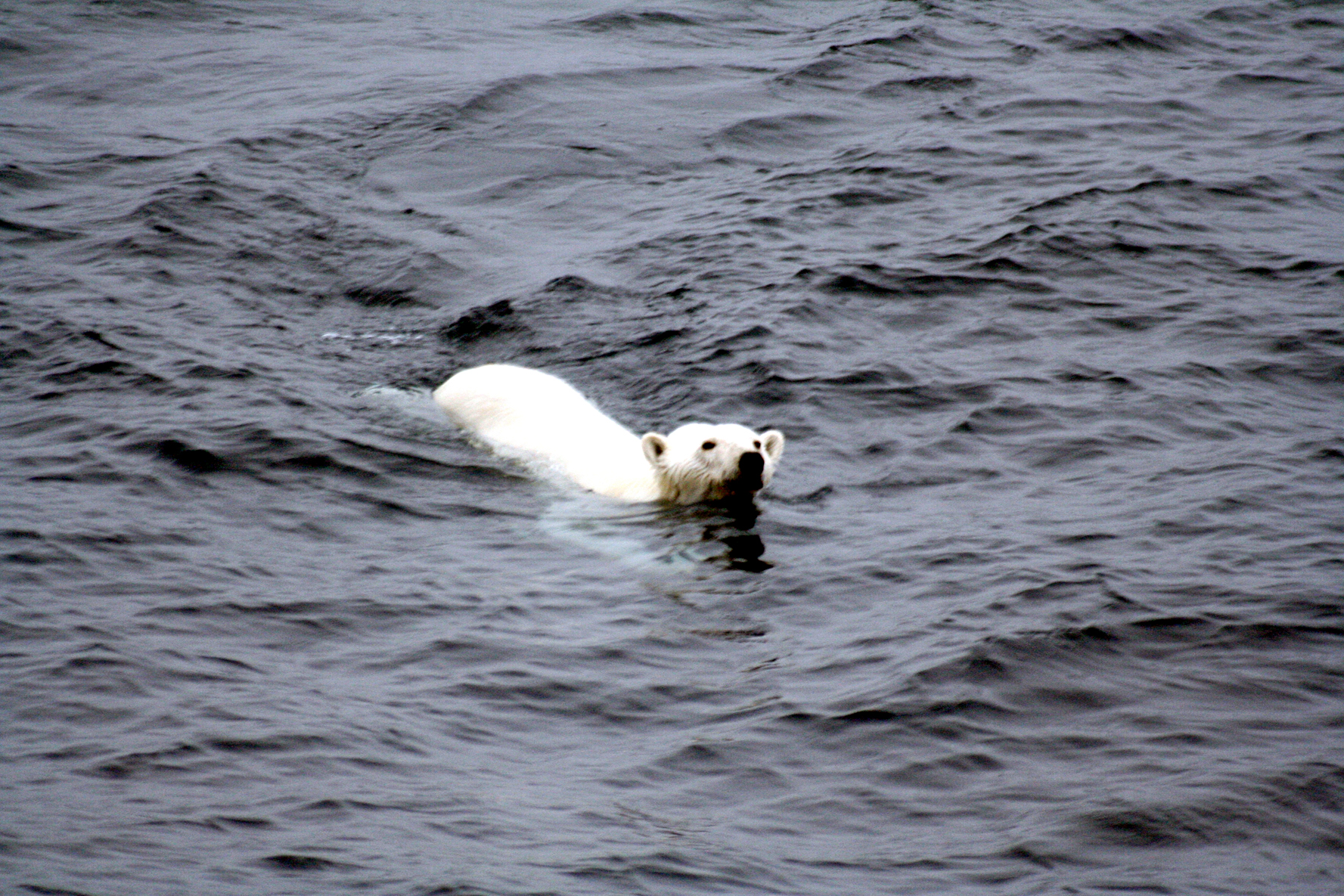
Swimming

Warnings about the future of the polar bear are often contrasted with the fact that worldwide population estimates have increased over the past 50 years and are relatively stable today. The total worldwide population of polar bears is about 26,000 as of 2021. While some subpopulations are stable, only one is increasing, and almost half lack sufficient data to draw any conclusion about their status.

Debate over the listing of the polar bear under endangered species legislation has put conservation groups and Canada's Inuit at opposing positions; the Nunavut government and many northern residents have condemned the U.S. initiative to list the polar bear under the Endangered Species Act. Many Inuit believe the polar bear population is increasing, and restrictions on commercial sport-hunting are likely to lead to a loss of income to their communities. Conservation groups argue that the purported increase in polar bear encounters in coastal Nunavut villages is caused by the reduction in sea ice associated with climate change, and that the future of the global population remains uncertain at best.

== See also ==
Bear hunting
