= Bernard Stonehouse =

British scientist (1926–2014)

- Born: 1 May 1926; Kingston upon Hull, England
- Died: 12 November 2014 (aged 88)
- Education: University College London, BSc 1953; Merton College, Oxford, D.Phil. 1957
- Known for: Penguin biology research
- Awards: Polar Medal
- Scientific career
- Fields: Polar research
- Institutions: University of Canterbury; University of Bradford; University of Cambridge
- Doctoral advisor: David Lack
- Doctoral students: Graeme Caughley; Ian Stirling

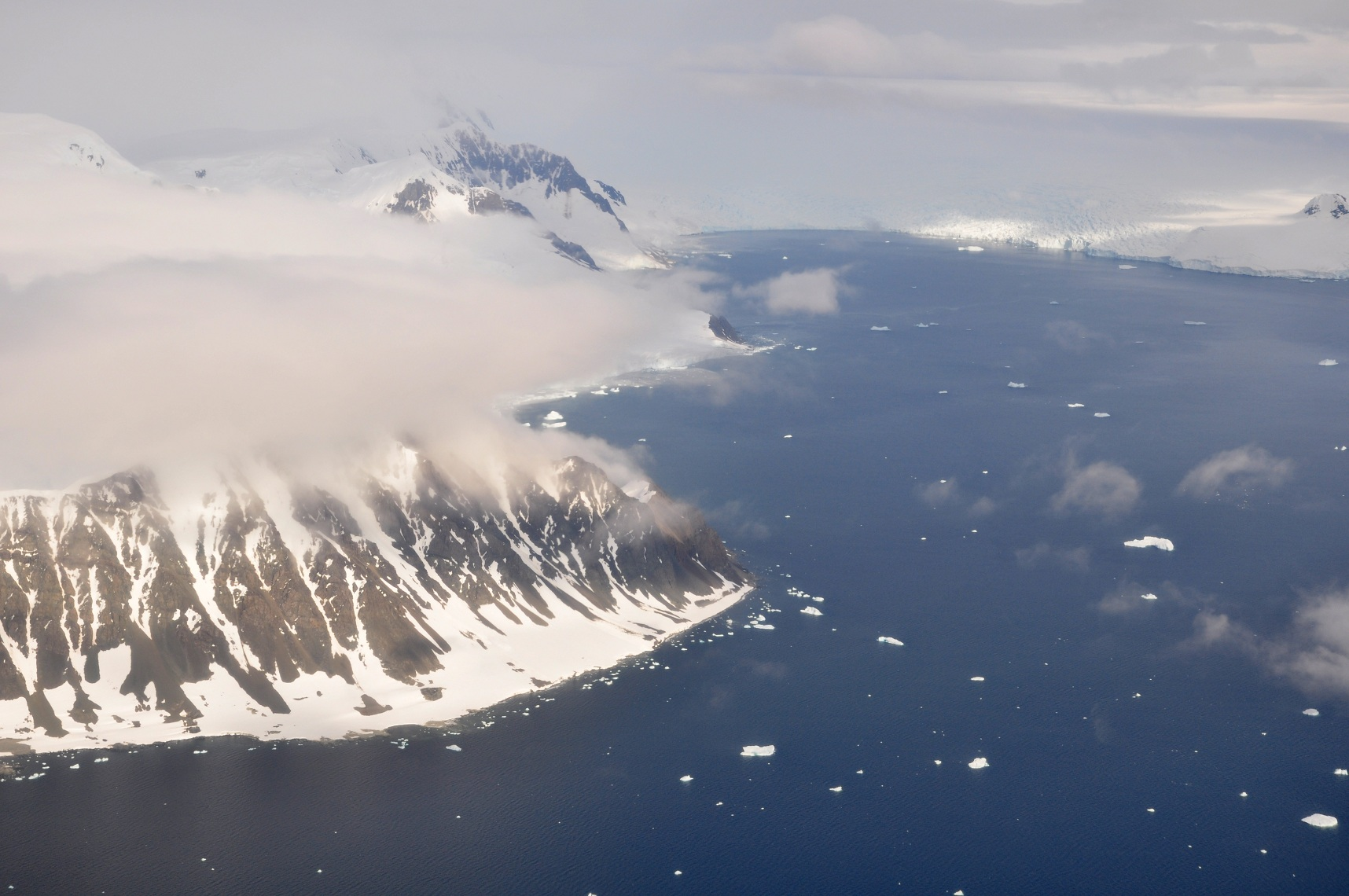
Stonehouse Bay, Antarctica (on the right in this picture), is named after Bernard Stonehouse.

Bernard Stonehouse (1 May 1926 – 12 November 2014) was a British scientist who specialised in animal behaviour, polar research and popular science. In 1953 he received the Polar Medal.

== Early life and military service ==
Stonehouse was born in Hull on 1 May 1926. He attended Hull Grammar School before joining the Royal Navy in 1944, and was seconded as a naval pilot to the Falkland Islands Dependencies Survey (later renamed the British Antarctic Survey) from 1946 to 1950.

== Further education and career ==
After returning to Britain in 1950, Stonehouse studied zoology and geology at University College, London, and then earned his D.Phil. from Edward Grey Institute of Field Ornithology and Merton College, Oxford, which involved spending 18 months studying emperor penguins on South Georgia.

He led the British Ornithologists' Union's centenary expedition to Ascension Island between 1957 and 1959. From 1960 to 1968, Stonehouse worked at the University of Canterbury (Christchurch, New Zealand) and later appointments saw him working at the University of British Columbia, the University of Bradford, and, as editor of the Polar Record, at the Scott Polar Research Institute (part of the University of Cambridge). He retired as editor in 1992 but continued as a senior associate, forming the institute's Polar Ecology and Management Group, and promoting Antarctic tourism.

Stonehouse's notable students include Graeme Caughley and Ian Stirling.

== Personal life ==
Stonehouse married Sally Clacey in 1955; they had two daughters and a son. He died on 12 November 2014.

== Legacy ==
He is commemorated in the names of Stonehouse Bay and Mount Stonehouse.

== Selected publications ==
- Animals of the Arctic: The Ecology of the Far North (1971)
- Young Animals: The Search for Independent Life (1973)
- Saving the Animals: The World Wildlife Fund Book of Conservation (1981)
- The Last Continent: Discovering Antarctica (2000)
- The Truth about Animal Intelligence (2002)
- The Truth about Animal Senses (2002)
