= Graeme Caughley =

New Zealand ecologist (1937–1994)

- Born: Graeme James Caughley; 28 September 1937; Wanganui, New Zealand
- Died: 16 February 1994 (aged 56); Canberra, ACT, Australia
- Education: University of Canterbury; University of Sydney
- Known for: The declining population paradigm
- Scientific career
- Fields: Ecology
- Workplaces: New Zealand Forest Service; Commonwealth Scientific and Industrial Research Organisation; University of Sydney
- Thesis: Growth, stabilisation and decline of New Zealand populations of the Himalayan thar (Hemitragus jemlahicus) (1967)
- Doctoral advisors: Bernard Stonehouse; Robert Sidney Bigelow

Graeme James Caughley FAA (28 September 1937 – 16 February 1994) was a New Zealand population ecologist, conservation biologist, and researcher. He combined empirical research with mathematical models, and supported the declining population paradigm.

== Childhood ==
Caughley was the middle of three children and the only son born to John Norman Caughley and Thelma Caughley. His father would take him on excursions, while his mother encouraged his curiosity. As a young child Caughley was very inquisitive and he recalled finding a seashell on top of a hill. At the age of seven, he determined that the sea must have once covered the hill and was proud to have resolved the problem. This event encouraged him to learn more about New Zealand's geology and as Gunn and Walker explain "Ecology had a close call with Graeme Caughley. He almost chose geology at the start of his career..."

== Education ==
=== Bachelors ===
Caughley attended Victoria University College in Wellington, New Zealand from 1956 to 1959. Tyndale-Biscoe writes that "there is no record of any particular lecturers influencing his thinking." In his last two years Caughley dropped down to part-time and went to work with his friend Thane Riney at the New Zealand Forest Service on feral goat herds.

=== Masters ===
Caughley continued his education at the University of Sydney (1960–1963) with his advisors Charles Birch (insect population ecologist) and Harry Frith (ornithologist). Frith was chief of the Australian Commonwealth Scientific and Industrial Research Organisation (CSIRO) and Caughley used the CSIRO sheep station to study the ecology of kangaroos. Caughley found that kangaroo groups are formed by a random process of members coming and leaving, which was in contrast to what he had seen in red deer. He interpreted this to mean that random grouping was density dependent with increased grouping at higher densities. An approximation of density could then be found by taking the average number of individuals per group in a given area. Continuing his research he found that red kangaroos are much more drought-tolerant than grey kangaroos, which visit water three times more often. In addition, he showed that grey kangaroos prefer areas of higher ground cover than do red kangaroos and that this may be a behavioural relic from when the Tasmanian wolf and Tasmanian devil overlapped in habitat with the kangaroo.

=== Doctoral ===
While working for the New Zealand Forest Service, Graeme used his research on the Himalayan tahr (Hemitragus jemlahicus) towards his doctoral work. He decided to work on tahr because at that time everyone claimed to be an expert on red deer and he thought that he would make a greater contribution working on the lesser known tahr. Caughley wanted to see if Thane Riney's eruption and stabilisation patterns in deer also applied to tahr. He used his studies at the Forest Service for his PhD thesis at the University of Canterbury (1962–1967) advised primarily by Bernard Stonehouse (Antarctic and penguin ecologist). Using three study populations of Himalayan tahr (judged to be in the initial increase, initial stabilisation, and decline stage) Caughley found that tahr follow the pattern that Riney had found in deer.

== Significant contributions ==
During 1966, Caughley presented methods by which to determine mortality patterns in mammals. He looked at mortality rate curves (qx) among ungulates, rats, voles, sheep, and man he found that they followed a common pattern. This "u" shaped pattern had a high juvenile mortality followed by a decrease and then a steady increase in mortality punctuated by a sharp increase with maturity. With this mortality pattern it was shown that although age of mortality differs among species as well as cause of death (disease, lack of food, predation) the trend that mammal species follow is similar. This is important in wildlife management since it shows that regardless of natural mortality factors populations tend to have high juvenile and mature deaths.

While working for the Forest Service and attending the University of Canterbury for his PhD, Caughley modified Lotka and Fisher's equations for birth rates in populations to ones that applied to seasonally breeding populations. He wrote that most of the animal world had a season for breeding and that if births were treated as occurring at only one point in time then these equations could be used for seasonally breeding populations. This modification now gave a more accurate estimate of the reproductive value of a population without overestimating births by assuming year around reproduction.

Caughley and Birch (1971) published "Rate of Increase" to point out some of the misuses with this equation. Originally applied mainly to insects and humans they claim that the questions asked by entomologists are not necessarily those asked by mammalogists and vice versa. It is this difference in questions that caused misuse of particular equations in the realm of vertebrate studies. They point out that the rate of increase at a given density for a population of a stable age distribution (rs) is not obtainable when looking at mammals. This is because the assumptions used to make the age distributions (rs=0) when used to estimate rs cause it to be low.

The second argument is that the maximum rate at which a population with a stable age distribution increases in a given environment (rm= intrinsic rate of increase) can be calculated with the correct data. It had however, been used incorrectly by mammalogists who thought that vertebrate life table and fecundity data somehow paralleled those of caged insects held at low density. The correction was to infer what the rate of increase for a given population would be at both the initial density and at a higher density. In this way they corrected a misapplication of models so that those managing populations would use the right equation for the question that they were asking.

Not only did Caughley clarify methods so that they would be more applicable to population ecology, but he also condensed material that he thought was useful. In "Analysis of Vertebrate Populations" he distilled analyses that he thought were most relevant to the field and chose those that were also easy to understand. R. S. Millar stated in his review that until this book literature on analyses had been scattered and difficult to understand, but Caughley made topics more readable.

Caughley also co-published a book on Wildlife Ecology, Conservation, and Management: the first portion of the book covers an overview of population ecology while the second part is on applied ecology or management. His last publication Conservation Biology in Theory and Practice gives a history of prehistoric and historic extinctions as well as a collection of case studies. It contains chapters that look at the different ways population dynamics, risks, and legislation are approached. Perez claims that there is such a high volume of conservation textbooks today, but this one is more of a handbook on diagnosing and treating problems with populations. This diagnostic style is in part due to it being written by two field biologists, something that Clinchy and Krebs say took sixteen years in the making. That this is the first time that field biologists have written a book on conservation biology is a breakthrough in conservation biology. Before this, textbooks written by lab ecologists were used to teach field ecologists in a more abstract theoretical way.

== Paradigm ==
Caughley advocated the use of the Declining Population Paradigm in conservation biology. This paradigm seeks to discover why a population is declining and how to prevent further declines. This opposes the small population paradigm that seeks to determine how long a small population will last. The declining population paradigm is not overly theoretical and does not deal with population viability analysis, effective population size, minimum viable populations or problems related to genetics. Caughley pointed out that it did not require a model to go out and observe what was going on in a system (cause and effect), although this lack of a mathematical model hinders generalisations by requiring case by case assessments.

Shortly after Caughley's death, Hedrick and colleagues argued against the declining population paradigm for what they called the inclusive population viability analysis (PVA) At a first reading it is difficult to discern what the counter argument is since they state that they agree with Caughley in that a broader understanding and synthesis of ideas is required. It is upon closer examination, however that the concept and statement that "one cannot always interpret the significance of deterministic factors unless a proper inclusive PVA is carried out". This paper was in reaction to Caughley's promotion of common sense and was written by those that encouraged the use of mathematical models. Caughley however, was not against mathematical models and used them to determine rates of increase, dispersal, fecundity, and mortality.

To truly understand the controversy one must read the two articles of "Viva Caughley!". Both articles were written as a rebuttal to Hedrick and colleagues, who claim that Caughley's ideas are overly simplistic. Clinchy and Krebs explain that in fact it was not simple enough and "the basic distinction in conservation biology is between field biologists and lab scientists". It then was a heated debate against those that used expensive modelling programs and those that went out to do the same thing with inexpensive tools purchased at a hardware store such as "pvc pipe and bits of string". Young and Harcourt suggest that upon careful observation there is little disagreement between what Caughley said and the rebuttal that Hedrick and colleagues gave, although they do castigate Hedrick and other PVA advocates for emphasising predictions based on models over more justifiable sensitivity analysis and real world threats to populations.

== Honours and awards ==
As listed by Tyndale-Biscoe

1960 Caughley Beach at Cape Bird, Ross Island named after Caughley in recognition of his work on Emperor and Adelie penguins

1970 Queen Elizabeth II Post-Doctoral Fellowship

1978 Analysis of Vertebrate Populations awarded 'Book of the Year' by the Wildlife Society, Washington, D.C.

1987 Kangaroos: Their Ecology and Management in the Sheep Rangelands of Australia awarded Whitley Book Award Certificate of Commendation by the Royal Zoological Society of New South Wales

1992 Elected to Fellowship of the Australian Academy of Science

1993 Awarded CSIRO Chairman's Medal for outstanding research achievements and leadership in the field of vertebrate ecology

1994 Peter Scott Award for Conservation Merit, Species Survival Commission of the International Union for the Conservation of Nature

== Selected works ==
- Gunn, Anne, and Graeme Caughley. Conservation biology in theory and practice. Blackwell Science, 1995.
- Caughley, Graeme. The deer wars: the story of deer in New Zealand. Heinemann, 1983.
- Caughley, Graeme, James M. Peek, and Susan L. Flader. "Comments on" Natural Regulation of Ungulates (What Constitutes a Real Wilderness?)"." Wildlife Society Bulletin (1973–2006) 9, no. 3 (1981): 232–238.
- Caughley, Graeme, B. Brown, and J. Noble. "Movement of Kangaroos After a Fire in Mallee Woodland." Wildlife Research 12, no. 3 (1985): 349–353.
- Barker, R. D., and Graeme Caughley. "Distribution and abundance of kangaroos (Marsupialia: Macropodidae) at the time of European contact: South Australia." Australian Mammalogy 17 (1994): 73–83.
