= Polar Bears International =

Non-profit conservation organization

- Formation: January 1992; 34 years ago
- Type: 501(c)(3)
- Tax ID no.: 77-0322706
- Headquarters: Bozeman, Montana; Churchill, Manitoba
- Executive Director: Krista Wright
- Vice President, Conservation: Amy Cutting
- Vice President Science & Policy: Geoff York
- Chief Scientist Emeritus: Steven C. Amstrup
- Board of directors: Patrick Keeley (Chair), Valerie Beck, (Vice Chair), Steven Dolman (Chief Financial Officer), Kristin Biniek (Secretary)
- Revenue: $3,448,904 (2024)
- Staff: 29 (2026)
- Website: polarbearsinternational.org

Polar Bears International (PBI) is a non-profit polar bear conservation organization registered in the U.S. and Canada. It is a science-based charity whose research, education, and advocacy programs address the issues that are endangering polar bears. While Churchill, Canada, serves as an important hub for its scientists and educators, the organization's work on behalf of polar bears spans the circumpolar Arctic, including Svalbard (Norway), Russia, Alaska (U.S.), and other parts of Canada.

Polar Bears International is known for its research efforts that inform conservation, with a team that includes polar bear and climate scientists on its staff and scientific advisory board. Its chief scientist emeritus is Steven Amstrup, winner of the 2012 Indianapolis Prize, considered the Nobel Prize of animal conservation. Prior to joining PBI's staff in 2010, Amstrup spearheaded the USGS team whose series of reports led to the polar bear listing as a threatened species under the Endangered Species Act.

To raise awareness and drive positive change, Polar Bears International offers a number of education and outreach programs. It also organizes various awareness events such as International Polar Bear Day (February 27), Arctic Sea Ice Day (July 15), and Polar Bear Week (the first week of November). These initiatives highlight the importance of preserving polar bears and the Arctic ecosystem.

Polar Bears International was founded in 1992 by a group of wildlife enthusiasts who traveled to Churchill, Canada, every year to watch and photograph polar bears. It has been led by Krista Wright since 2013.

== Conservation Challenges ==
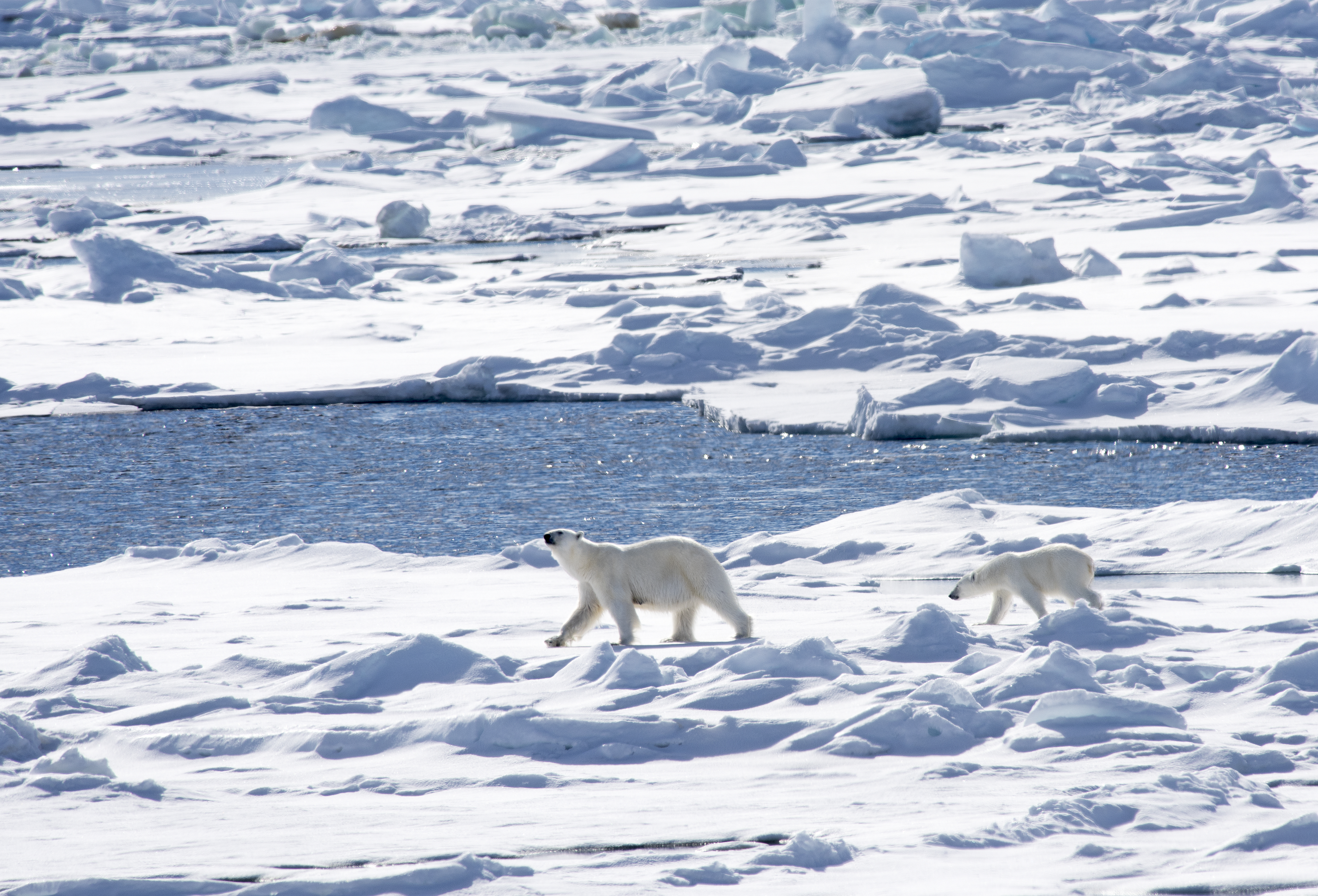
Polar bears rely on a platform of sea ice to catch their seal prey.

Polar bears are marine mammals, built to live on top of the frozen ocean. They hunt seals from the surface of the sea ice, and also rely on the ice to travel, hunt, breed and sometimes den.

As climate change warms the planet, Arctic sea ice has been melting at a rate of 12.2% per decade, reducing the polar bears’ access to their seal prey and affecting their survival. Scientists predict that without action on climate change, we will lose most of the world’s polar bears by the end of the century.

Some polar bear populations in areas with longer ice-free seasons have already declined. The Western Hudson Bay population, for example, is roughly half of what it was in the 1980s, and the Southern Beaufort Sea population has declined by about 40 percent. Other threats to polar bears include poorly regulated hunting; disturbances from human activity, especially during the denning period; conflicts with people; and pollution. Polar Bears International works to address both the long- and short-term challenges that polar bears face.

== Activities ==
Research - Working with partners, Polar Bears International conducts and/or helps fund studies that add to our understanding of polar bears and impact their conservation. This work ranges from research on polar bear moms and cubs at den sites, to insights on the polar bears’ energy use to developing new technology, such as “burr on fur” tracking tags and “bear-dar” radar systems designed to warn communities of approaching bears. PBI scientists also address climate change. Key climate-related papers include a 2020 study, published in Nature Climate Change, that answered the critical question of when polar bear subpopulations will disappear based on three different greenhouse gas scenarios. Another, published in Science in 2023, addressed a loophole in the Endangered Species Act, paving the way to allow ESA evaluations to include the impacts of greenhouse gas emissions from proposed projects on polar bears. A third, published in Nature Communications in 2024, showed that Churchill’s polar bears could disappear as early as the 2030s if nations failed to meet the targets set in the Paris Climate Agreement. In 2025, a paper in Nature Communications explored perspectives on polar bears from Indigenous people in Churchill.

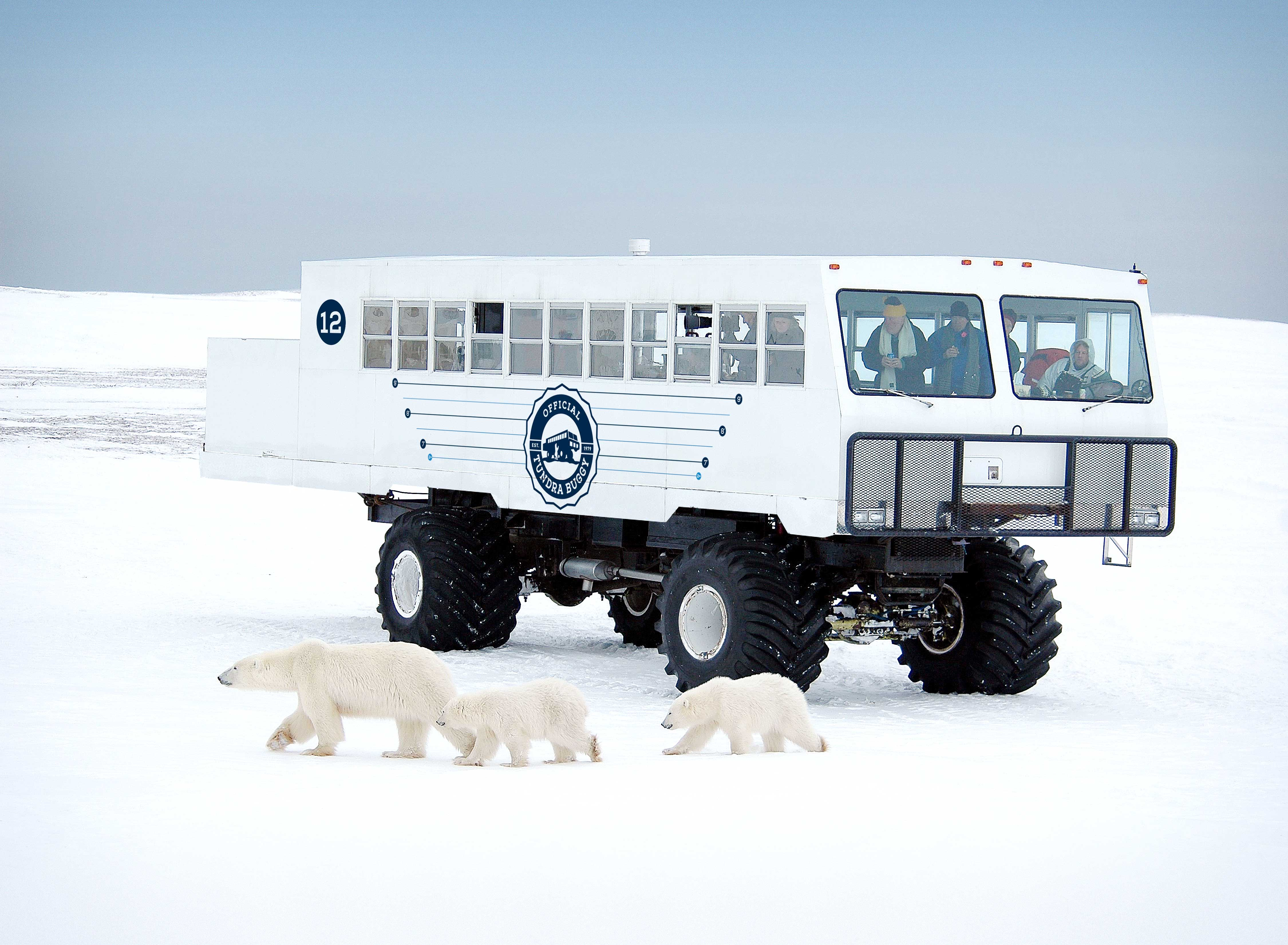
Polar Bears International conducts outreach from Churchill, Manitoba, the famous polar bear gathering place.

Education and Outreach - From its hub in Churchill, Canada, where hundreds of polar bears gather each fall to wait for the sea ice to return to Hudson Bay, Polar Bears International engages with visitors at its interpretive centre, Polar Bears International House. It also conducts free, live “Tundra Connections” webcasts from the tundra near Churchill during polar bear season, linking scientists and educators with classrooms, students, and lifelong learners around the world. The webcasts are broadcast from a roving EV media buggy, Tundra Buggy One, which also hosts visiting media, including Good Morning America’s Michael Strahan, the BBC, and NBC Nightly News. Other PBI outreach from Churchill includes Polar Bear, Beluga Whale, and Northern Lights cams in partnership with explore.org that reach millions of people every year. In partnership with Google, polar bear habitats in Churchill were added to Google Maps in February 2014. In 2023, staff scientist Alysa McCall gave a TED Talk on PBI’s polar bear-human coexistence efforts.

To amplify its conservation message, Polar Bears International partners with a network of roughly 50 zoos and aquariums in the U.S., Canada, and Europe. These Arctic Ambassador Centers take part in PBI’s awareness events and help educate the public about polar bears, sea ice loss, and the need to take action on climate change. PBI also conducts Climate Alliance training sessions for zoo and aquarium professionals that include a visit to Churchill to experience polar bears and the tundra first hand.

In addition to its interpretive centre in Churchill, Polar Bears International has a pop-up center, the PBI Ice House, in Longyearbyen, Svalbard, Norway, to reach the thousands of Arctic cruise passengers who pass through the town every year. Located at 78° North, it is the northernmost interpretive pop-up in the world. PBI also works with Arctic guides to provide them with current, science-based information on polar bears and the threats they face.

Human-Polar Bear Coexistence - As the summer sea ice retreats in the Arctic, polar bears are spending more time ashore in more places, increasing the risk of negative encounters with people. Polar Bears International works to help polar bears and people coexist so both can thrive. These efforts include working with partners on researching the history and causes of polar bear attacks, studying the best non-lethal deterrents, including the effectiveness of bear spray in Arctic conditions, exploring waste-management problems and solutions, fostering community exchanges among northern communities, and developing materials from brochures to videos, posters, and coloring books to keep people safe in polar bear country.

The nonprofit also helps communities develop plans to coexist with polar bears. This work includes supporting the town of Churchill in working to establish the first polar-bear-safe community, helping Cree communities in Ontario live safely with the increasing number of visiting polar bears, and working with communities in Svalbard, Norway, on bear-safe measures.

Polar Bears International is also exploring a tech solution dubbed “bear-dar” to warn communities, campers, or work stations of an approaching polar bear. A radar technology that relies on AI to distinguish bears from other animals like reindeer or large dogs, researchers tested "bear-dar" in Churchill over several polar bear seasons and worked to refine the AI at the Assinibone Park Zoo. PBI is now conducting further tests at the Eureka weather station in the Qikiqtaaluk region of Nunavut, where polar bear sightings have increased in recent years.

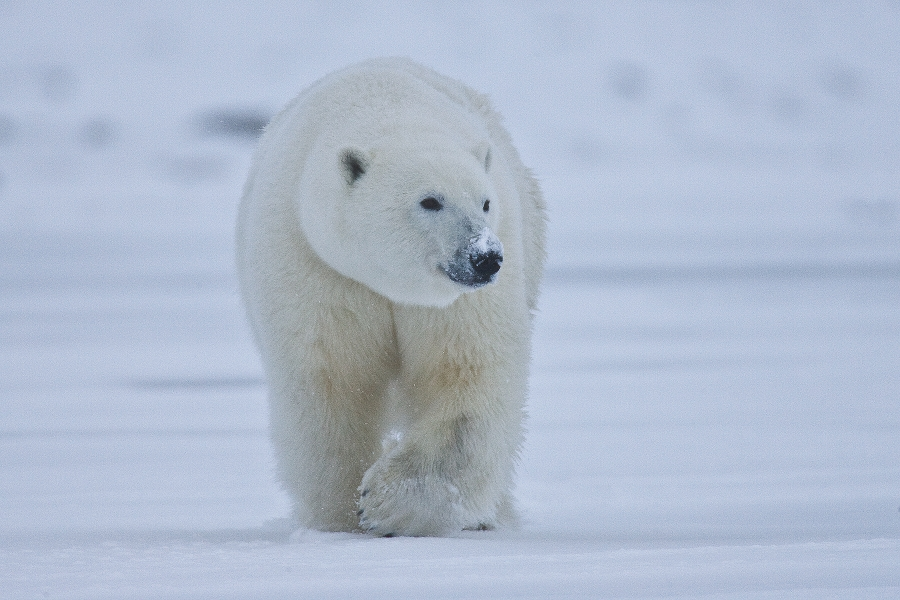
A young polar bear in the Arctic National Wildlife Refuge.

Policy and Advocacy - Polar Bears International engages in policy and management plans by participating in local, national, and international groups – providing the best available science to governments, institutions, and policy makers. Two of PBI’s staff scientists serve as active members of the International Union for the Conservation of Nature (IUCN) Polar Bear Specialist Group — composed of “up to 35 members appointed based on their direct and relevant expertise in polar bear research, management, conservation or education" — and PBI’s policy experts participate in meetings of the Polar Bear Range States, the management body for the five polar bear nations (Canada, Greenland, Norway, Russia, and the United States). This includes playing active roles in two working groups: Climate Communications and Human-Polar Bear Conflict.

Because of Polar Bears International’s long history of research on polar bears, its staff scientists are uniquely equipped to provide expert testimony on policies that impact polar bear survival. For example, PBI submitted expert commentary on the risks posed to polar bear moms and cubs from proposed drilling in the Arctic National Wildlife Refuge, a key polar bear denning area in Alaska, and its chief scientist testified before the U.S. Congress on the issue.

Polar Bears International also engages the public in advocacy through its awareness events, climate action tools, and special initiatives such as its Vote for Polar Bears Campaign, which urges voters to support candidates who prioritize action on climate change.

== Controversies and disputes ==
=== Support of skin trade ===
Polar Bears International (PBI) has faced criticism from some conservation advocates for its opposition to proposals to transfer polar bears (Ursus maritimus) from Appendix II to Appendix I of the Convention on International Trade in Endangered Species of Wild Fauna and Flora (CITES), which would prohibit international commercial trade in their skins and other body parts.

During CITES conferences in 2010 and 2013, the United States and Russia proposed uplisting the species to Appendix I. Polar Bears International opposed the proposals, stating that the scientific criteria for uplisting had not been met and that restricting international trade would not address the primary threat facing polar bears, which the organisation identifies as climate change. Archived statements from PBI noted that "PBI's position on the proposed CITES uplisting from Appendix II to Appendix I is that it is not warranted for polar bears at this time".

Reporting during the 2013 negotiations noted that several environmental organisations—including Polar Bears International and the World Wide Fund for Nature (WWF)—did not support the U.S. proposal to ban international trade in polar bears. Critics argued that opposing an Appendix I listing allowed the continued international market in polar bear skins, while supporters of PBI's position maintained that trade restrictions would have limited conservation impact compared with addressing climate change.

Because polar bears remain listed in Appendix II of CITES, international trade in their skins and other parts continues to be permitted under a system of export permits and quotas administered by national authorities. Trade records show that the skins of at least 1,760 polar bears entered international commercial trade between 2013 and 2024.

Observers have also noted overlap in policy positions between PBI and other environmental organisations that opposed the uplisting, including WWF. Conservation scientist Geoff York, who previously worked in WWF's Global Arctic Programme before later becoming Senior Director of Research and Policy at Polar Bears International, has been cited as an example of continuity between the organisations in debates over polar bear trade and management policies.

The organisation also operates fundraising initiatives such as "Adopt-a-Polar-Bear" campaigns, which encourage donations for polar bear conservation programs. Some critics have argued that opposing stricter international trade protections while promoting polar bear protection campaigns creates a contradiction in the organisation's messaging, although PBI states that its conservation strategy focuses primarily on addressing climate change as the principal threat to the species.

Other conservation organisations, including the Natural Resources Defense Council, supported the proposed Appendix I uplisting and argued that reducing international trade could help decrease incentives for continued harvest.

=== Support of trophy hunting ===
Polar Bears International has stated that regulated polar bear hunting may be compatible with conservation under certain circumstances, including hunting systems in parts of Canada where Indigenous communities receive quotas and may sell a limited number of permits to visiting sport hunters. These hunts allow foreign hunters to participate in guided expeditions in which a hunter may shoot a polar bear under the authority of a locally issued tag.

Statements by scientists associated with the organisation have reflected this position. In interviews and publications, PBI chief scientist Steven Amstrup has argued that restrictions on trade or hunting would not address the primary threat to polar bears, which he identifies as climate change, and has stated that some populations could continue to be harvested under existing wildlife management systems.

Polar Bears International has also stated that in regions where hunting is permitted, Indigenous communities receive a set number of tags allowing them to harvest bears within sustainable limits. In some parts of Canada, local hunters may sell a limited number of these tags to visiting sport hunters, who participate in guided hunts and are allowed to shoot the bear that the local hunter might otherwise have taken. According to the organisation, such hunts often result in fewer bears being taken because sport hunters are typically less successful than local hunters. However, promotional materials for guided polar bear hunts offered by some outfitters have advertised success rates of near or at 100%. The resulting income from these hunts can also contribute to local economies in northern communities where employment opportunities are limited.

The role of trophy hunting in polar bear conservation has been debated within the scientific and conservation community. Critics argue that the international market for hunting trophies and polar bear skins can create economic incentives for continued harvest, while supporters of regulated hunting systems maintain that they can provide income for northern communities and remain compatible with conservation goals if quotas are properly managed.

Discussions about trophy hunting have also intersected with debates over international trade restrictions. Proposals to transfer polar bears to Appendix I of the Convention on International Trade in Endangered Species (CITES) would not have banned hunting outright but would have prohibited international commercial trade and significantly restricted the import of hunting trophies into many jurisdictions. Within the European Union, for example, an Appendix I listing would place the species under Annex A of EU wildlife trade regulations, effectively preventing the import of polar bear hunting trophies into all 27 EU member states.

A similar effect was observed in the United States after polar bears were listed as “threatened” under the U.S. Endangered Species Act in 2008, which triggered a ban on importing polar bear trophies under the U.S. Marine Mammal Protection Act. Research examining the policy found that although harvest quotas in Nunavut remained largely unchanged, American participation in guided polar bear trophy hunts declined significantly once trophies could no longer be imported into the United States, reducing the proportion of bears taken by sport hunters.

Trophy hunting is also typically size-selective, with hunters preferentially targeting the largest individuals. In polar bears, trophy hunts overwhelmingly focus on large males, with studies noting that more than 90% of bears targeted by trophy hunters are large males in prime physical condition. Such selective removal of the largest animals has raised concerns among researchers because large, dominant males often play a disproportionate role in reproduction.

Because international trophy hunting depends on the ability of hunters to export trophies, restrictions on cross-border trade have been shown to reduce participation in polar bear sport hunts, suggesting that broader trade prohibitions could similarly diminish demand from international trophy hunters.

== See also ==
- International Polar Bear Day
