= Ian Stirling (biologist) =

Canadian zoologist

Ian Grote Stirling OC FRSC
- Born: September 26, 1941; Nkana, Zambia
- Died: May 14, 2024 (aged 82); Edmonton, Alberta, Canada
- Citizenship: Canadian
- Education: University of British Columbia; University of Canterbury
- Known for: Polar bears
- Spouse: Stella
- Children: 3
- Scientific career
- Fields: Mammalogy; Population ecology; Natural history
- Workplaces: Environment Canada; University of Alberta
- Thesis: Population ecology of the Weddell seal (Leptonychotes weddelli) in McMurdo Sound, Antarctica (1968)
- Doctoral advisor: Bernard Stonehouse
- Other academic advisors: James F. Bendell

Notes
- See obituary in The Vancouver Sun

Ian Grote Stirling OC FRSC (September 26, 1941 – May 14, 2024) was a research scientist with Environment and Climate Change Canada and an adjunct professor in the University of Alberta Department of Biological Sciences. His research has focused mostly on Arctic and Antarctic zoology and ecology, and he was one of the world's top authorities on polar bears.

Stirling authored five non-technical books and more than 250 articles published in peer-reviewed science journals. Over the course of his career, and well into his retirement from Environment Canada in 2007, when he became a scientist emeritus, he wrote and spoke extensively about the danger posed to polar bears by global warming.

== Early life and education ==
Ian Stirling was born to Andrew and Margaret Stirling on September 26, 1941 in Zambia, where his father worked as a mining engineer. They returned to Canada after the Second World War, settling in the mining town of Kimberley, British Columbia. He completed his B.Sc. at the University of British Columbia (UBC) in 1963, and his M.Sc. in zoology at UBC in 1965, where he met his spouse, Stella.

For his M.Sc. thesis, Stirling studied captive blue grouse under James F. Bendell. In 1968, Stirling received his doctorate from the University of Canterbury, New Zealand having done his field work on the Weddell seal from Scott Base in Antarctica, followed by post-doctoral research on South Australian fur seals at the University of Adelaide in Australia. His three children were born in New Zealand, Australia and Canada, respectively.

== Career ==
From 1970 to 2007, Stirling was employed as a research scientist for the Canadian Wildlife Service. His research focussed on polar bear biology and ecology, with his most notable work being a long-term study of polar bears in western Hudson Bay near Churchill, Manitoba. He was among the first to draw attention to the potential impacts of climate change on polar bears. He was also an adjunct professor at the University of Alberta for more than 30 years, after settling in Edmonton in 1972. Stirling retired in 2007.

Stirling has served as a member of the Committee of Scientific Advisors of the Marine Mammal Commission, and he was the first Canadian to be elected president of the Society for Marine Mammalogy. He was a long-standing member of the IUCN Polar Bear Specialist Group and was also a scientific advisor to Polar Bears International.

== Death ==
Stirling was diagnosed with lymphoma in 2019. The illness advanced to leukemia in 2023 and he died of effects of cancer in 2024, at age 82.

== Awards and recognition ==
- Ian McTaggart-Cowan Lifetime Achievement Award from the Canadian branch of The Wildlife Society (2021)
- Polar Bear Conservation Award of the Polar Bear Range States of the 1973 Agreement on the Conservation of Polar Bears (2020)
- Polar Bears International Ice Bear Lifetime Achievement Award (2019)
- Weston Family Prize for Lifetime Achievement in Northern Research (2015)
- Kenneth S. Norris Lifetime Achievement Award (2013)
- Honorary Doctorate, D.Sc., University of British Columbia (2013)
- Honorary Doctorate, D. Sc., University of Alberta (2013)
- National Wildlife Federation (US), National Conservation Achievement Award in The Special Achievement Category (2009)
- Fellow of the Royal Society of Canada (2007)
- Northern Science Award, Indian and Northern Affairs Canada (2002)
- Officer of the Order of Canada (2000)

== Selected publications: academic papers ==
- Stirling I (1997) The importance of polynyas, ice edges, and leads to marine mammals and birds. Journal of Marine Systems 10, 9–21.
- Stirling I, Lunn NJ, Iacozza J (1999) Long-term trends in the population ecology of polar bears in western Hudson Bay in relation to climatic change. Arctic 52, 294–306.
- Stirling I, Parkinson CL (2006) Possible effects of climate warming on selected populations of polar bears (Ursus maritimus) in the Canadian Arctic. Arctic 59, 261–275.
- Stirling I, Derocher AE (2012) Effects of climate warming on polar bears: a review of the evidence. Global Change Biology 18, 2694–2706. doi:10.1111/j.1365-2486.2012.02753.x

== Selected publications: non-technical ==
- Stirling, I. (1988). Polar bears. Ann Arbor: University of Michigan Press. ISBN 9780472101009
- Stirling, I. (1992). Bears. United States: Sierra Club Books for Children. ISBN 9780871564412. IRA Teachers' Choice. NSTA-CBC Outstanding Science Trade Book for Children
- Stirling, I (ed). (1993) Bears: Majestic Creatures of the Wild. United Kingdom: HarperCollins. ISBN 9780002199865
- Stirling, I (2011) Polar Bears: The Natural History of a Threatened Species. Fitzhenry and Whiteside. Markham, ON. 334 pp. ISBN 978-1554551552
