= Steven Amstrup =

American zoologist (born 1950)

Steven Carl Amstrup
- Born: February 4, 1950 (age 76); Fargo, North Dakota, United States
- Education: University of Washington (1972); University of Idaho (1975); University of Alaska Fairbanks (1995)
- Awards: Indianapolis Prize (2012); Bambi Award (2012)
- Scientific career
- Fields: Zoology, polar bear research
- Institutions: United States Fish and Wildlife Service; United States Geological Survey; University of Wyoming
- Thesis: Movements, distribution, and population dynamics of polar bears in the Beaufort Sea (1995)

Steven C. Amstrup (born February 4, 1950) is an American zoologist who studies bears, especially polar bears. He is the 2012 recipient of the Indianapolis Prize.

== Early life ==
Steven Amstrup was born in Fargo, North Dakota, where he took an interest in bears at an early age. He attended the University of Washington as an undergraduate, receiving his bachelor's degree in forestry in 1972. In 1975, he graduated from the University of Idaho with a master's degree in wildlife management. He studied black bears in central Idaho for his master's thesis. He earned his doctoral degree from the University of Alaska Fairbanks in 1995.

In 1975, he began working for the United States Fish and Wildlife Service in Wyoming where he studied pronghorn antelope and sharp-tailed grouse. In 1980 he moved to Alaska where he took over the United States Fish and Wildlife Service's fledgling Polar Bear Research Project. In 1996 Amstrup's research position was transferred to the United States Geological Survey. During his 30-years in Alaska, he studied polar bear ecology, primarily in the Beaufort Sea. In 2007, Amstrup's team of scientists prepared nine reports leading to the 2008 listing, by United States Secretary of the Interior Dirk Kempthorne, of polar bears as a threatened species under the Endangered Species Act. In 2010, he published an article in Nature finding that even if climate change led to complete melting of the polar ice packs, the ice could return if global temperatures subsequently cooled. He has taught at the University of Wyoming as an adjunct professor since 2006.

His contributions to polar bear conservation were honored in 2012, when the Indianapolis Zoo named him the winner of their biennial Indianapolis Prize. Later the same year, he was presented with an Our Earth Bambi Award in Düsseldorf.

== Activism ==
After retiring in 2010, Amstrup became the chief scientist for Polar Bears International. Having observed the effect of climate change on polar bears and their Arctic habitat during his career as a researcher, he now works as an advocate for polar bears and promotes climate change mitigation.

== Personal life ==
Amstrup is married. He and his wife are building an energy-efficient house in northeast Washington.
