= Pagophily =

Preference or dependence on water ice

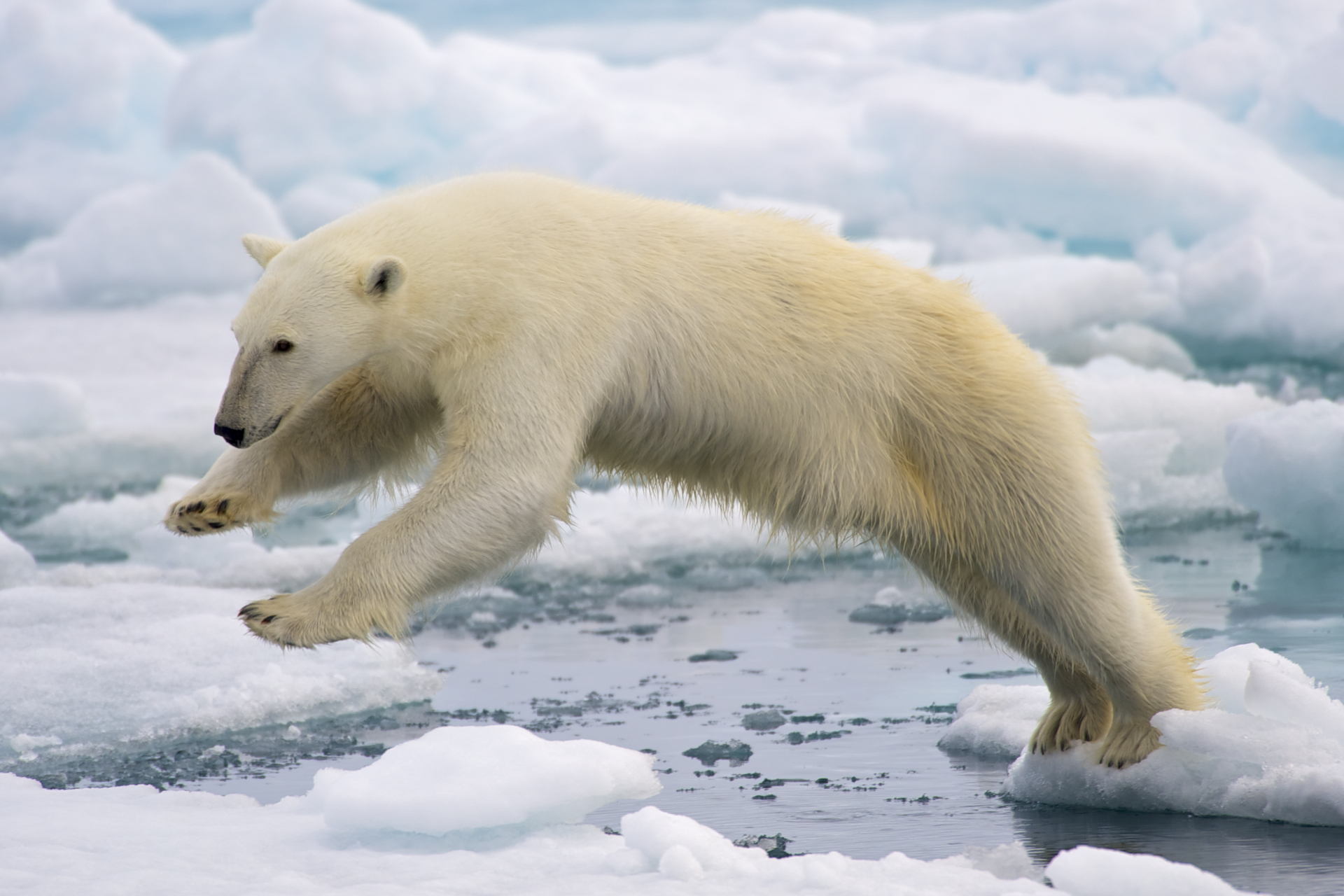
The polar bear is an example of a pagophilic species.

Pagophily or pagophilia is the preference or dependence on water ice for some or all activities and functions. The term Pagophila is derived from the Ancient Greek pagos which means "sea-ice", and philos meaning "-loving".

Pagophilic animals, plants, etc. prefer to live in ice or perform certain activities in the ice. For example, a number of ice seals are described as pagophilic as they have adapted to breed and feed in association with their ice habitat. The preference for a frozen habitat has been observed in several mammalian, avian and invertebrate species.

== Evolutionary and adaptive basis ==
The dependence and preference for ice and snow is believed to have an evolutionary basis dating back to the last ice age, approximately 2.6 million years ago. In a period where the earth was covered in ice pans, the ancestors of pagophilic mammals developed the ability to hunt on and around ice out of necessity. Some researchers have argued that life originated in icy habitats, in the form of microorganisms that can survive in harsh conditions. Furthermore, the study of pagophilic organisms on earth has contributed to the belief that life is present on other extremely cold planets. Survival in extreme habitats such as ice habitats is possible due to behavioural and/ or physiological adaptations. These adaptations may include: hibernation, insulation in the form of fat or blubber, increased hair or feather growth, or the presence of an antifreeze-like enzyme.

Pagophily is beneficial for survival, and often critical. Pagophilic mammals can use ice as a platform to get closer to prey, or to get farther away from predators. Sea ice can also be used for breeding, nurturing young and other behaviours if there is less risk for predation on the ice than on land. For many animals their primary food supply may live near the ice as well or in the water under the ice.

== In mammals ==
=== Phocidae ===
The family Phocidae is a family of pinnipeds, known as "true seals". A study by Stirling (1983) indicated that the formation of large amounts of ice on coastlines approximately 15 million to 5 million years ago forced many early phocine seals to adapt their breeding and feeding behaviour due to their ice habitats. According to the National Oceanic and Atmospheric Administration ice seals are found in the Arctic and Antarctic. Breeding behaviour, specifically, the nursing of pups has been researched extensively in ice-living seals. The evolution of feeding behaviours and diets of ice-dwelling seals in both the Arctic and the Antarctic has also been studied.

==== Ice-breeding and lactation periods ====
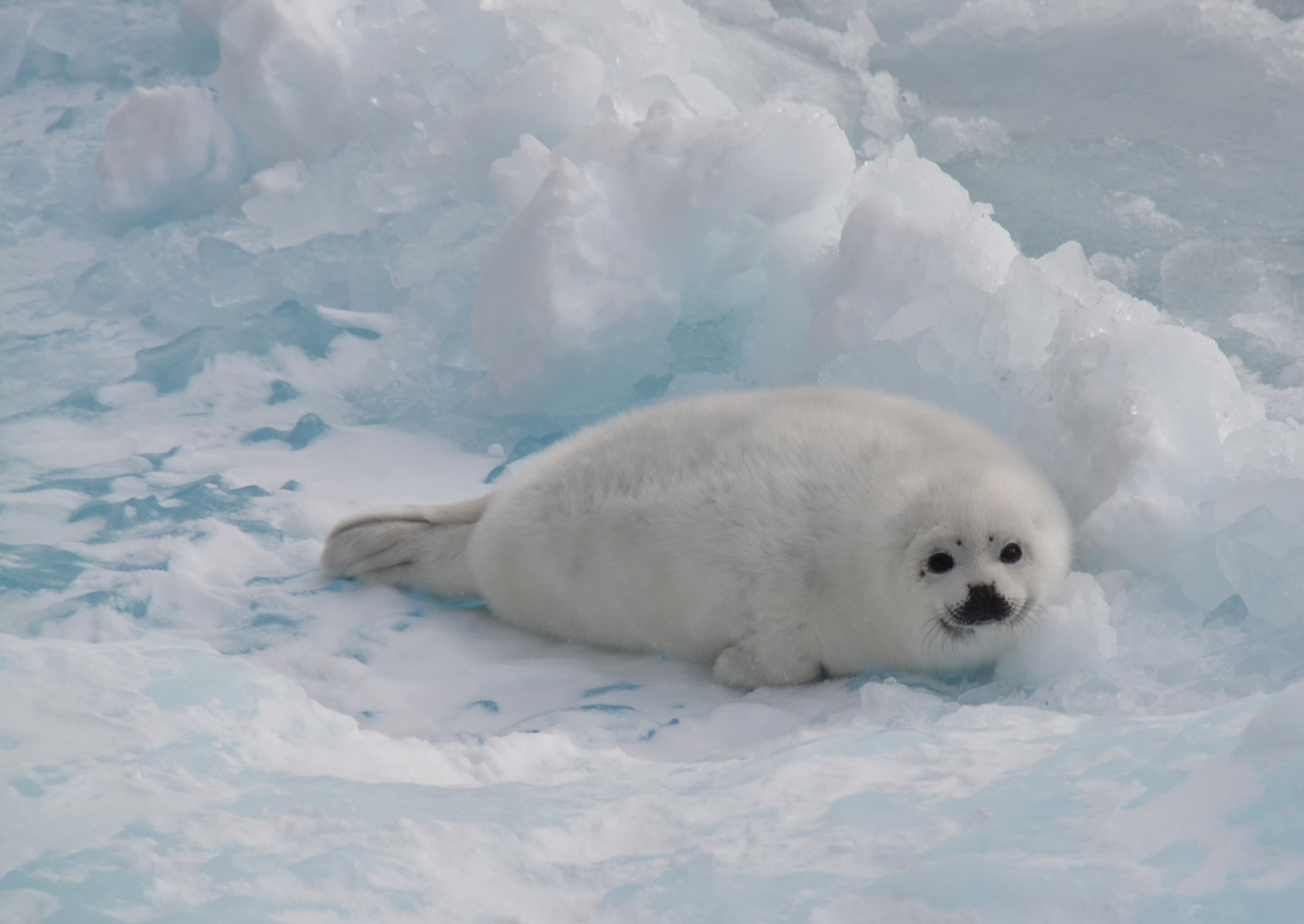
Weaned seal pup

Among phocid seals, there is some variation of how maternal and pup behaviour takes place during lactation. Variation is dependent on access to the water, risk of predation and access to food. There are two main strategies seen in seal breeding in ice habitats. The first strategy is observed in grey seals, hooded seals and harp seals. These animals display a short lactation period in which a large amount of energy is transferred from the mother to the pup. Pups are inactive during this time and have not yet entered the water. In bearded seals, less energy is transferred to pups over a longer period of time, pups enter the water and begin feeding independently while they are still receiving milk from their mother.

Researchers argue that there is an adaptive basis of both behaviours. In a longer lactation period where relatively low amounts of energy are transferred to pups over a long period of time, pups stay closer to their mothers and are protected from predators. In a shorter lactation period, pups are weaned at a young age and as a result, become independent in feeding. In addition to early independence, milk given to pups during this brief period has a very high energy content.

The evolution of brief lactation periods and high energy transfer is related to the habitat of the seals. Species that give birth to their pups on stable substrate, such as land or "fast-ice" (which is attached to land) have longer lactation periods and take longer to achieve feeding independence. Species that give birth on unstable ice pans have short and efficient lactation periods so that their young can achieve independence and develop adequate fat/blubber layers before the ice melts or moves. The development of short lactation periods in most phocid seals is an adaptation that has allowed them to succeed and thrive on ice. Pups receive high amounts of fat during their short lactation period and thus achieve independence at a young age.

==== Ice-feeding ====
Research on ringed seals in the Arctic has shown that young seals mainly consume invertebrates while adult seals consume primarily Arctic cod. The dietary differences between younger and older ice-seals is likely due to differences in diving capabilities and foraging experience. The capture of invertebrates is easier for juvenile seals due to their lack of hunting experience. Adult ice-seals, however, prefer to consume fish due to their high energy content.

Diving behaviour is critical for hunting in adult seals. Seals pursue their prey, primarily fish, by diving under fast-ice. The ability to dive underneath the ice is important for catching prey. Research by Davis et al. has highlighted the importance of seals' vision. When diving deep below the ice, limited light poses a challenge to hunting. The adaptation of amphibious seal vision has contributed to the evolution of pagophilia in seals.

=== Polar bear ===
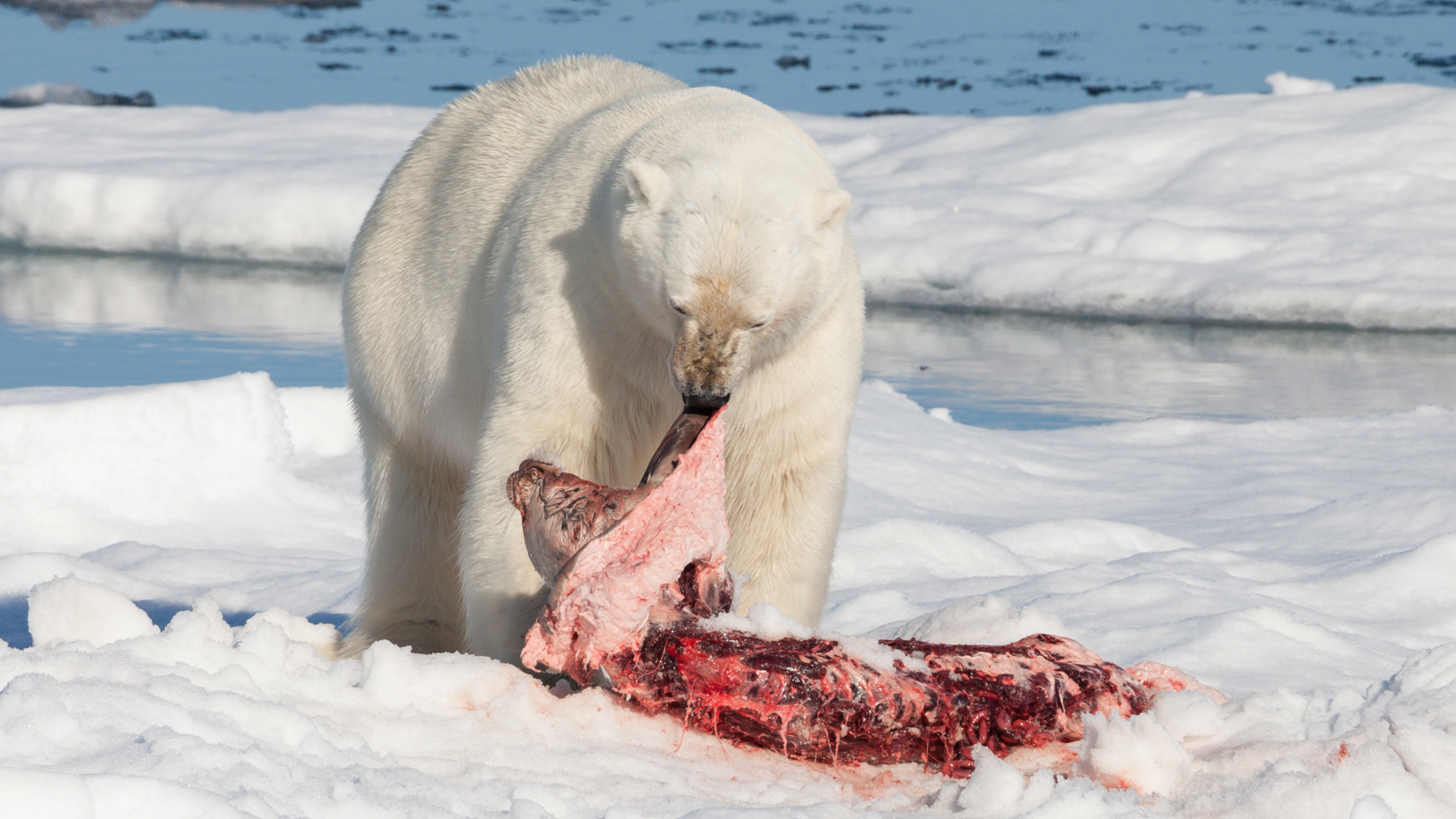
Polar bear with its prey.

The polar bear (Ursus maritimus) is dependent on sea ice for hunting and feeding. Seals are the primary food source for polar bears so the amount of time that they spend living on ice is largely dependent on ice-seal populations. Research by Mauritzen et al. has indicated that polar bear habitat selection (i.e. ice versus land) is determined by finding a balance between the benefits of abundance of prey on ice and the additional energy expenditure in ice habitats. Furthermore, polar bears that live on dynamic, constantly changing "open ice" have more access to prey than those that live on fast ice.

U. maritimus possess a number of adaptations to allow them to survive in harsh, cold environments. These thermoregulatory adaptations that allow for the pagophilic lifestyle of the bears include a thick layer of fur, a thick hide and a layer of fat, also called blubber.

== In birds ==
Several species of marine birds live on ice caps in both the Arctic and Antarctic. G.L. Hunt of the University of California has researched the adaptive basis for marine birds dwelling in "ice-influenced environments". According his research, sea ice can both inhibit access to foraging opportunities and provide enhanced experiences for foraging. In both the Arctic and Antarctic oceans, large populations of zooplankton, algae and small fish live directly under sea ice. Access to enhanced foraging opportunities is a plausible explanation for pagophily in marine birds.

=== Genus Pagophila ===
Genus Pagophila is a genus of birds that consists of only one species: Pagophila eburnea, also known as the ivory gull. The ivory gull is found in the Arctic in the northernmost parts of Europe and North America.

Ivory gulls feed on crustaceans, fish and rodents and are also considered opportunistic scavengers. The gulls often follow pagophilic mammals such as seals and polar bears and feed on the remains of their prey.

== In invertebrates ==
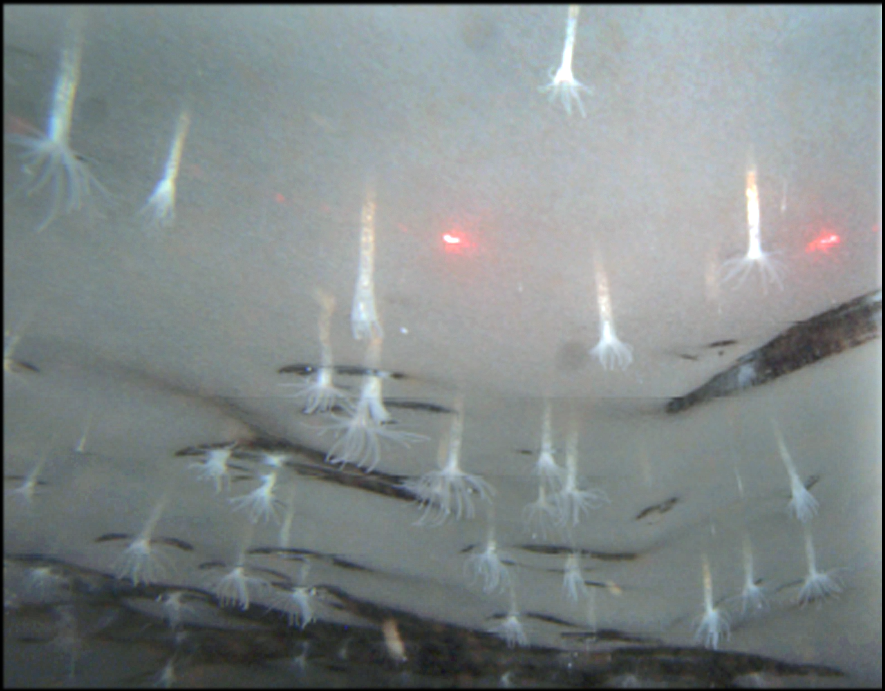
Edwardsiella andrillae

Sea ice invertebrates serve as important food sources for many Pagophilic vertebrate species.

=== Gammarus wilkitzkii ===
Gammarus wilkitzkii is an amphipod species that lives below Arctic sea ice. This organism uses a relatively wide variety of food sources including detritus, sea algae and the remains of other crustaceans. As a result of its harsh under-ice habitat, Gammarus wilkitzkii has developed a broad range of sources for nutrients to compensate for temperature and spatial changes of the ice.

=== Edwardsiella andrillae ===
First described in 2013, Edwardsiella andrillae is an "ice-loving" sea anemone discovered in Antarctica. The white anemones were observed by scientists of the Antarctic Geological Drilling Program (ANDRILL). The organisms live burrowed in the ice, upside down with their tentacles "protruding out into the frigid water". This is the first species of sea anemone that has been observed to live in ice rather than on the ocean floor. Research regarding the diet and lifestyle of Edwardsiella andrillae is ongoing.

== Impact of climate change ==
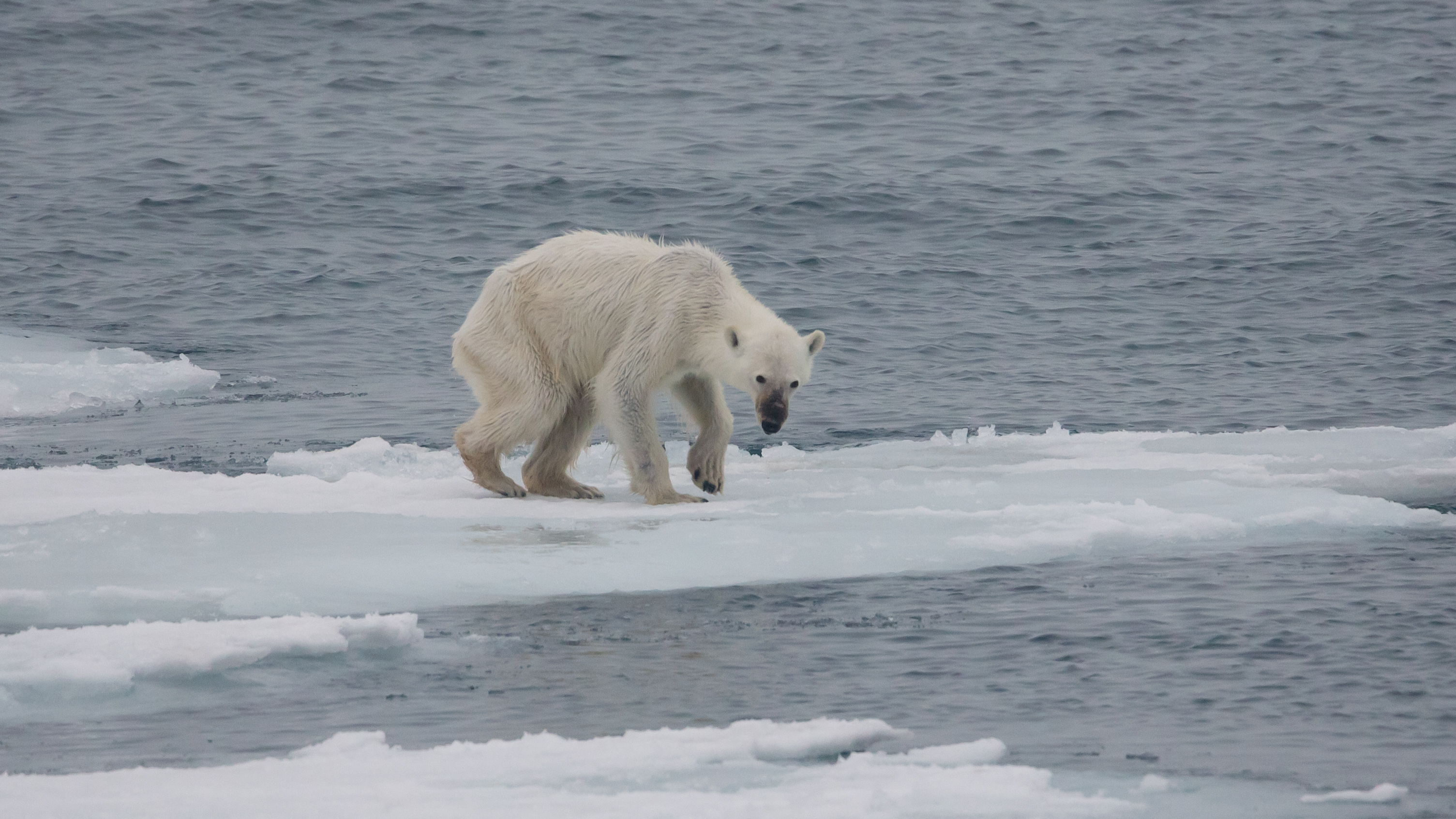
Starving polar bear

Climate change and the reduction of sea ice in polar regions has had significant impacts on organisms that prefer or depend on ice habitats. A "stochastic population projection" has shown that there will likely be drastic declines in the polar bear population by the end of the 21st century. Polar bears rely on seals and fish as their primary food source. While the bears can hunt land mammals such as caribou and fox, they can survive off of land prey for only approximately 6 months. Without the abundance of sea ice, polar bears cannot access seals and fish and, thus, can starve. These projections were important in the decision to list the polar bear as a threatened species under the U.S. Endangered Species Act.

In addition to threatening polar bear populations researchers also argue that seal populations will also be impacted by climate change. "The breeding-habitat loss in their traditional breeding areas [will impact] distributional changes and in all probability abundance reductions". Seals use ice to nurture their young and teach them to hunt; however, with the reduction of ice due to climate change, seals cannot teach their young to hunt before their lactation period is over. Climate change poses a significant threat to pagophilic animals.

== See also ==
- Pagophila
- Sea ice
- Arctic
- Antarctic
- Climate change
