= Ice seal =

Ice seal, or (in the Southern Hemisphere) pack-ice seal is a general term applied to any one of a number of pinniped species of the family Phocidae whose life cycle is completed largely on or about the sea ice of the Earth's polar regions.

The following are widely considered pagophilic or "ice-loving" species:

- Subfamily Monachinae
  - Ross seal
  - Crabeater seal
  - Leopard seal
  - Weddell seal
- Subfamily Phocinae
  - Bearded seal
  - Hooded seal
  - Harp seal
  - Ringed seal
  - Ribbon seal
  - Spotted seal or larga seal
