= Schönbrunn Zoo =

Zoo in Vienna

Schönbrunn Zoo Tiergarten Schönbrunn
- Tiergarten Schönbrunn logo

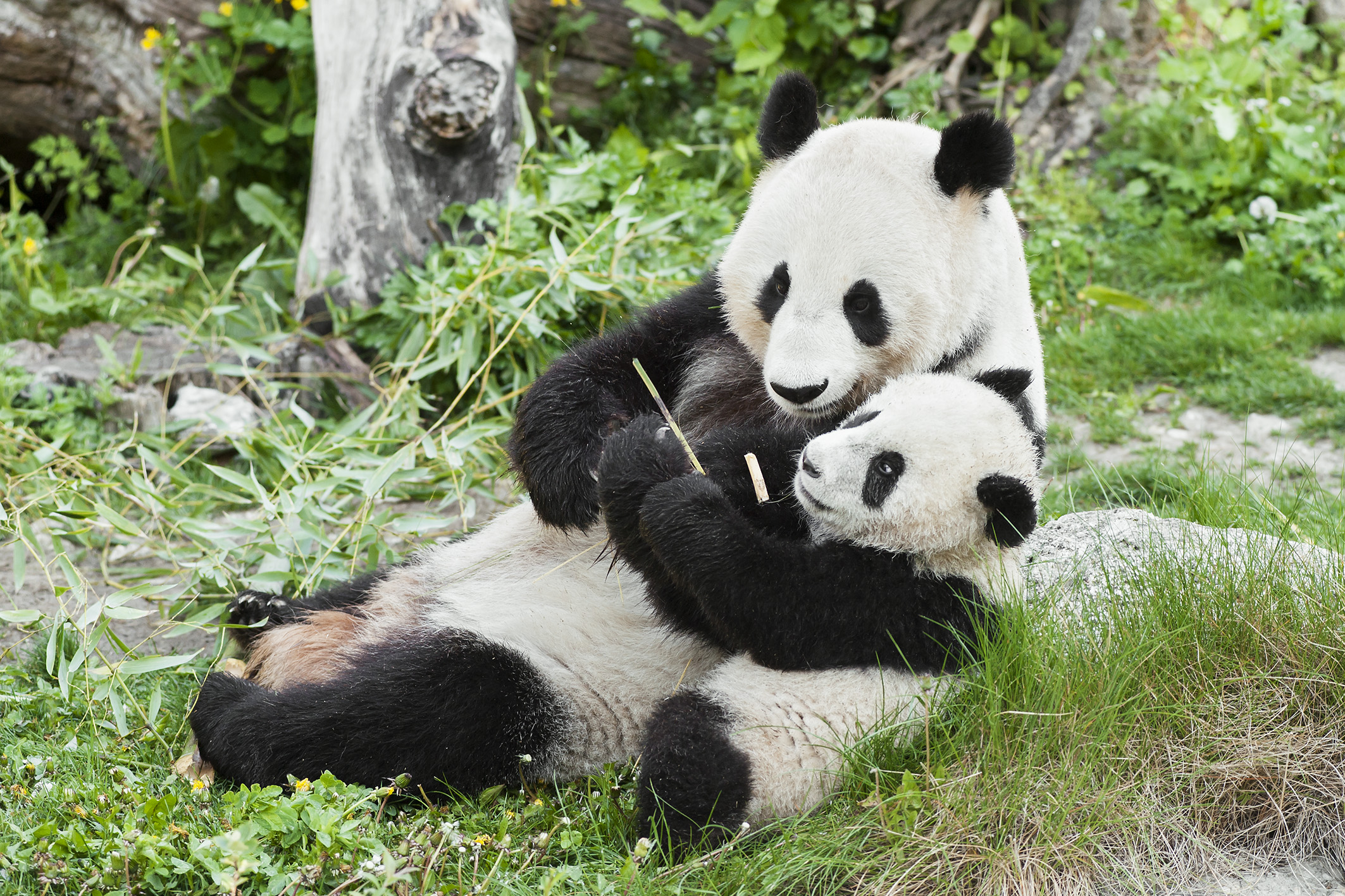
- Giant pandas in Schönbrunn Zoo
- Interactive map of Schönbrunn Zoo; Tiergarten Schönbrunn
- 48°10′56″N 16°18′09″E
- Date opened: 31 July 1752; 273 years ago
- Location: Schönbrunn Palace, Vienna, Austria
- Land area: 17 ha (42 acres)
- No. of animals: 6,239 (2026)
- No. of species: 502 (2026)
- Annual visitors: >2,000,000
- Memberships: IUCN, WAZA, EAZA, VDZ, OZO, Species360
- Owner: Republic of Austria
- Director: Stephan Hering-Hagenbeck
- Management: Ministry for Digital and Economic Affairs
- Public transit: U-Bahn: at Schönbrunn at Hietzing; S-Bahn: at Wien Penzing
- Website: www.zoovienna.at

Schönbrunn Zoo (German: Tiergarten Schönbrunn; also simply called Vienna Zoo) is a 17-hectare (42-acre) zoo in the city of Vienna, Austria. Established in 1752, it is the world's oldest zoo still in operation. It is also a UNESCO World Heritage Site, being a part of the Schönbrunn Palace gardens. It generally receives more than 2 million visitors every year.

As of 2021, it presented a total of 707 different species with around 8,250 specimens. Its primary attractions include the giant pandas, being one of only 27 zoos in the world to house them.

Anthony Sheridan's zoo rankings recognised Schönbrunn Zoo as the best zoo in Europe in years 2008, 2010, 2012, 2014, 2018 and 2021. Zoologist Stephan Hering-Hagenbeck has been the zoo's director since 2019.

== History ==
=== Founding and early years ===
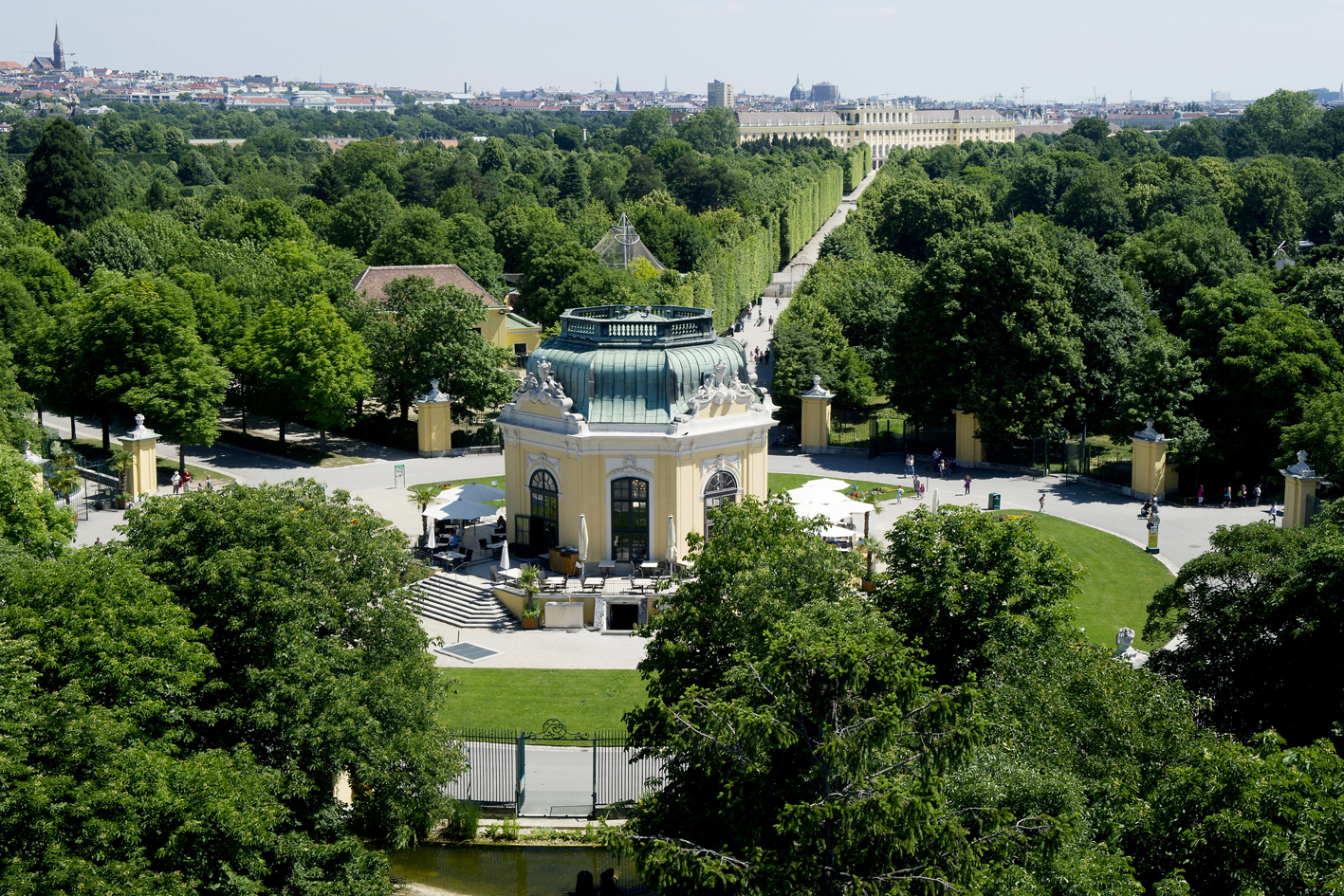
The Imperial Pavilion is the historic centre of Schönbrunn Zoo.

Schönbrunn Zoo was the brainchild of Francis Stephen of Lorraine, the husband of Maria Theresa, the empress of the Habsburg monarchy at the time. In 1745, Francis Stephen commissioned the architect Jean Nicolas Jadot de Ville-Issey to design a menagerie in the park at the Habsburg-Lorraine's summer residence in Schönbrunn.

Twelve enclosures were created in the park, each with equally sized structures for the animals, as well as an administration building with a front garden. A pond and two yards were added later. After approximately one year of construction, the menagerie was unveiled to guests in the summer of 1752. The last section to be completed was the octagonal pavilion at the heart of the site, which was designed as a breakfast and social room and finished in 1759. This pavilion, which still serves as the zoo's historical center, has been used as a restaurant since 1949.

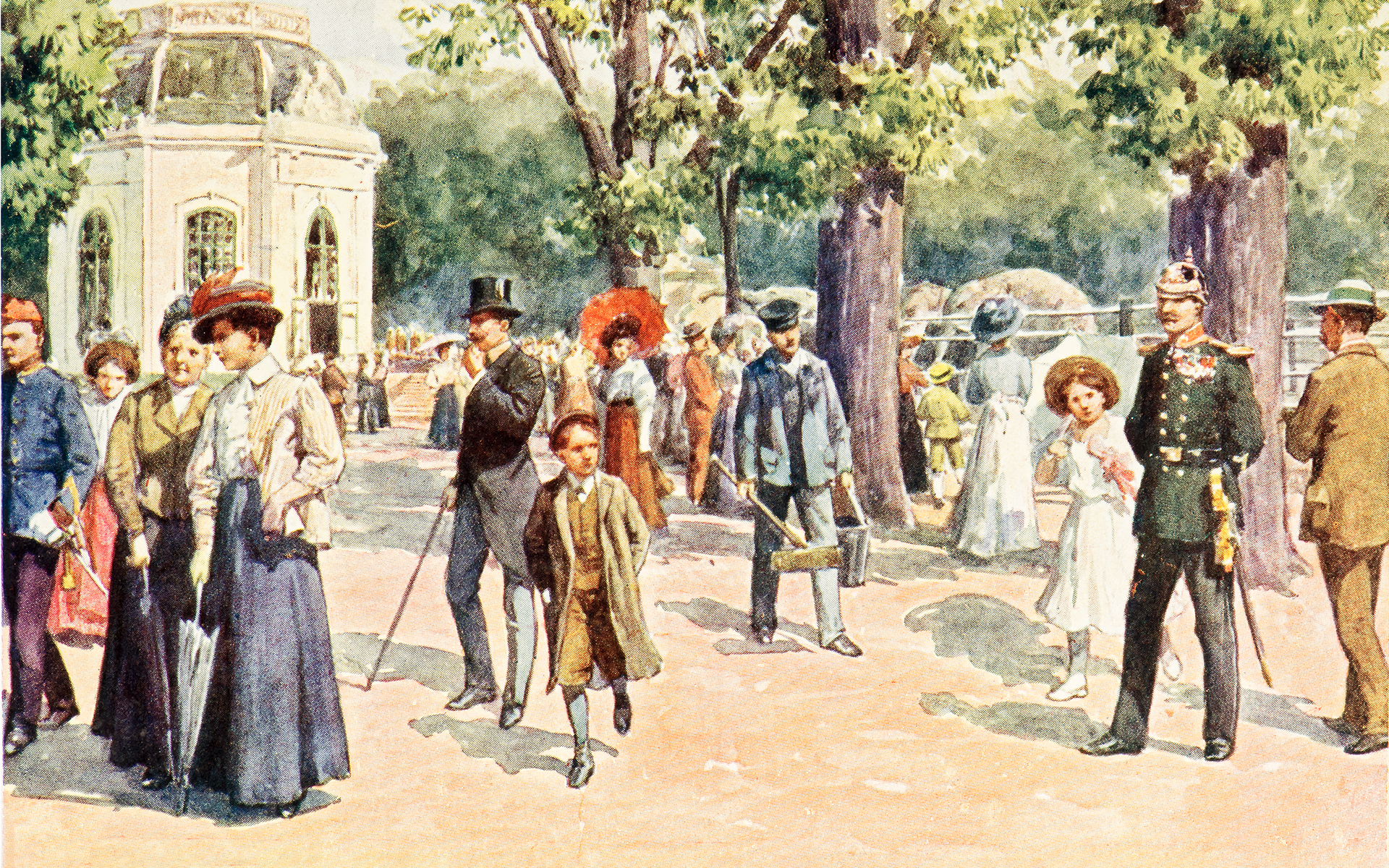
Visitors at the zoo (historical postcard)

The first elephant, an Indian elephant, arrived at the zoo in 1770, and the first predators—wolves and bears—arrived in 1781. Polar bears, big cats, hyenas, and kangaroos joined the collection around 1800, along with another pair of Asian elephants. Initially, the menagerie was reserved for the imperial family. Later, access was extended to schools, diplomats, and private guests. In 1778, the menagerie, along with the palace and park, was opened to "decently dressed persons" on Sundays. By this time, the zoo had begun welcoming visitors on a daily basis, attracting not only locals from Vienna and the surrounding areas but also international guests. The exotic animals and detailed descriptions in early zoo guides drew widespread interest.

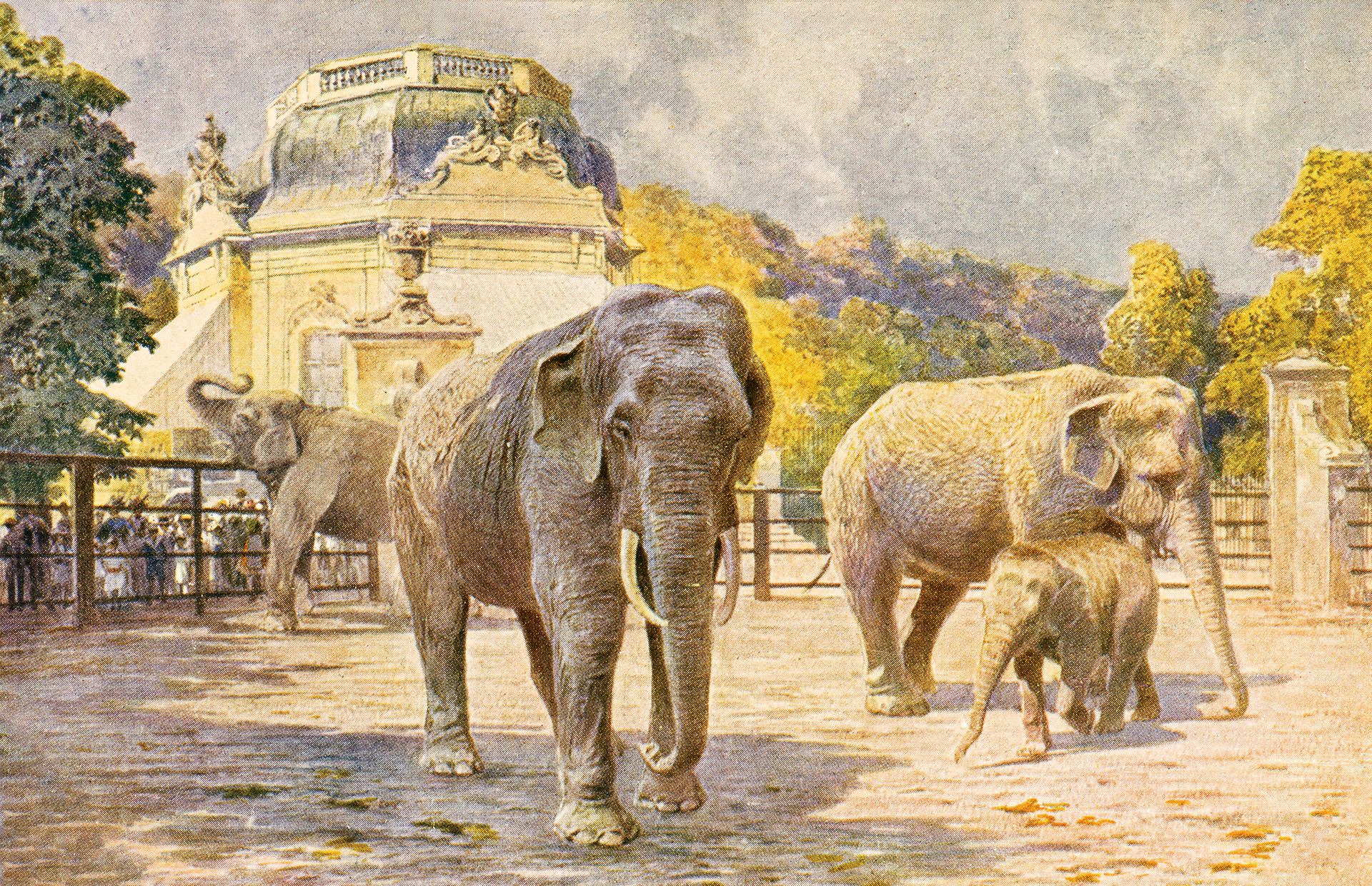
Asian elephants at the zoo (historical postcard)

=== In the 19th century ===
In 1828, Schönbrunn Zoo received its first giraffe as a gift from the Viceroy of Egypt. Its arrival sparked a widespread fascination, influencing fashion, handicrafts, and social life in Vienna. Giraffe motifs adorned clothes, shoes, and utensils, while new hairstyles, a perfume, a theatrical play, and two musical compositions inspired by the giraffe were created.

The zoo underwent significant changes toward the end of the 19th century. Alois Kraus, who served as director from 1879 to early 1919, reorganized the historic grounds to better accommodate the animals and improve the visitor experience. New animal enclosures and farm buildings were constructed or modernized, and the zoo was expanded to the east and south. By the early 20th century, Schönbrunn Zoo was widely regarded as one of the most beautiful zoos in the world.

In 1906, the first elephant to be conceived in a zoological garden was born on its grounds.

The complex remained the private property of the imperial family until the dissolution of the Austro-Hungarian Empire in 1918.

=== World Wars and the 20th century ===
Only 400 animals survived World War I due to supply shortages and associated hygiene problems. In some instances, animals were slaughtered to feed other animals, and in one occasion, a polar bear was shot dead by a disgruntled soldier who mistakenly thought that it was being fed more than him. The zoo was able to endure thanks to the residents of Vienna, who organized a relief campaign and donated animals and materials to sustain the institution.

Otto Antonius, who served as director of Schönbrunn Zoo from 1924 to 1945, was the first biologist to lead the zoo. Under his leadership, the number of animals increased to more than 3,000 by 1930. Antonius introduced the concept of breeding endangered species for conservation and worked to raise public awareness about nature preservation. He strengthened relationships with the media, universities, and museums to promote the zoo's mission. Notably, the term "menagerie" was officially replaced with "zoo" in 1926 to reflect its modernized role in education and conservation.

At the end of World War II, the zoo suffered severe damage from aerial bombings, which destroyed or significantly damaged many enclosures. More than 1,000 animals died during this time, leaving only 300 survivors. Antonius himself committed suicide along with his wife on the same day Soviet troops arrived. The Soviet and later British occupation forces assisted in the zoo's reconstruction efforts after the war.

Julius Brachetka, director from 1945 to 1958, revived public interest through entertaining media appearances often featuring animals from the zoo. The first promotional posters were created during this period, and photography competitions were introduced to engage visitors. In 1959, a new aquarium and terrarium building was opened to replace structures for ostriches and reptiles that had been destroyed during the bombing.

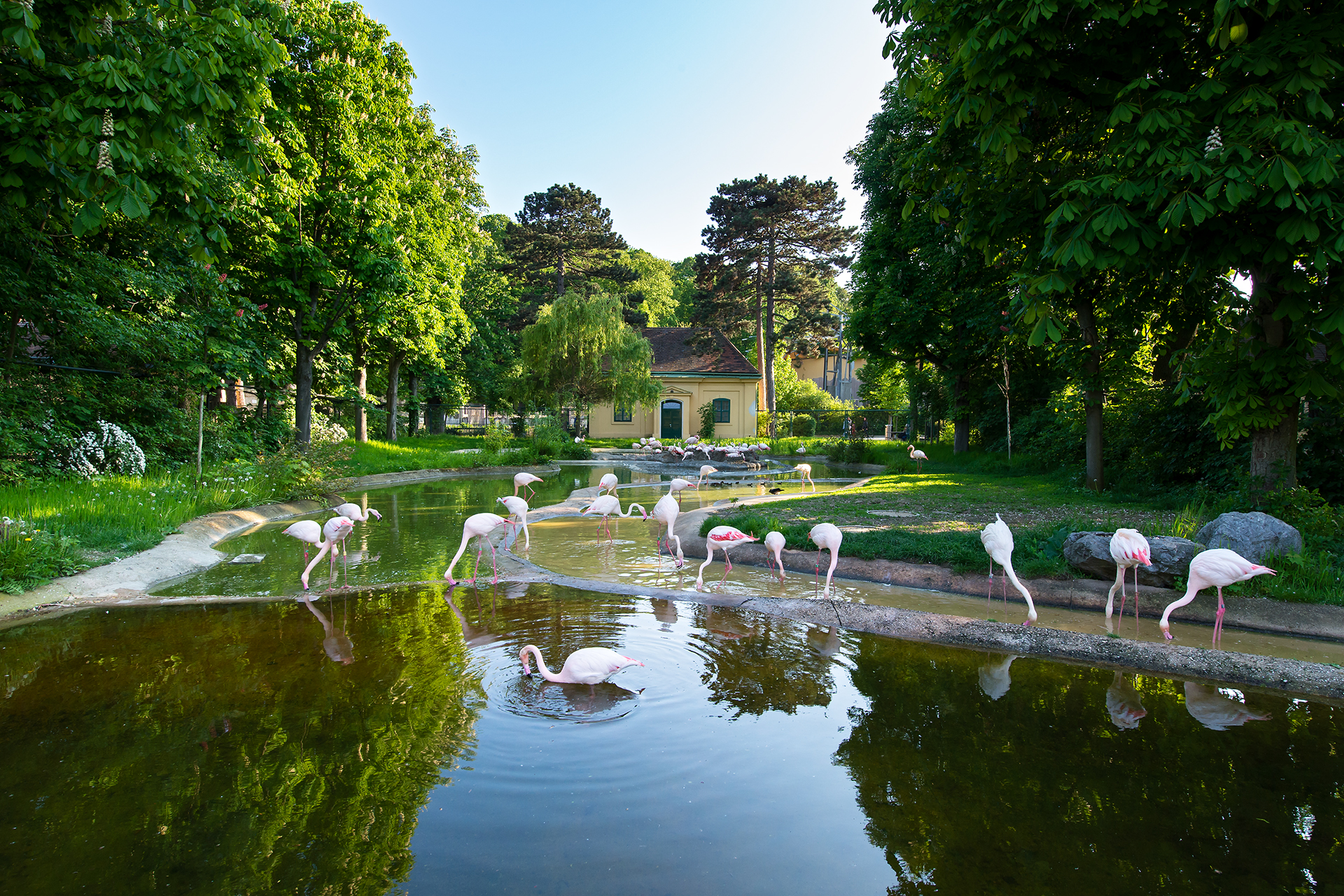
The baroque ambience characterises the appearance of the zoo to this day.

Under the leadership of Walter Fiedler from 1967 to 1987, the zoo's original area was doubled to 12 hectares with the conversion of the Kleinen Fasangarten (Little Pheasant Garden) to the east. Significant milestones during this time included the opening of a children's zoo in 1969 and the establishment of one of Europe's first zoo education departments in 1976.

By the late 1980s, criticism of outdated animal husbandry practices had reached a peak. Proposals to close the zoo or relocate it to another district of Vienna were actively discussed. However, these discussions ended in 1991, after which the zoo was restructured as Schönbrunner Tiergarten-Ges.m.b.H., a private entity managed separately from federal administration. The Republic of Austria remained the sole shareholder.

Helmut Pechlaner, a veterinarian and former director of Alpenzoo Innsbruck, was appointed managing director. With support from the Austrian government, numerous donors, and sponsors, he oversaw the modernization and expansion of the zoo. The first completed project was the small monkey house in 1992, featuring two "monkey islands" in the baroque pond as outdoor enclosures for ring-tailed lemurs and gibbons. Additional expansions included a section of the Vienna Woods to the south, the Tirolerhof (Tyrolean Farmyard), a modern elephant park, enclosures for big cats and giant pandas, an insectarium, and one of Europe's largest rhino enclosures, which housed two Indian rhinos, gifted in 2006 by Nepal's former royal family. These rhinos had been orphaned and were unable to be reintegrated into the wild.

The ensemble of Schönbrunn Palace, Zoo and Palace Park was declared a UNESCO World Heritage Site in 1996. The same year saw the unveiling of the first large bronze sculpture by Gottfried Kumpf, a lion. More bronze sculptures that remain a popular photo motif to this day were added over the following decades. The Rainforest House was opened to celebrate the zoo's 250th anniversary in 2002, which was also the year in which the first koalas arrived at Schönbrunn and the panorama railway experience was opened.

=== Recent years ===
Dagmar Schratter succeeded Helmut Pechlaner as sole managing director on January 1, 2007, and held the position until the end of 2019. During her tenure, the zoo received five awards recognizing it as the best in Europe, celebrated the birth of five giant panda cubs, and achieved a record 2.6 million visitors in 2008. Stephan Hering-Hagenbeck, formerly of Tierpark Hagenbeck in Hamburg, was introduced as her successor in autumn 2019 and assumed the role in January 2020.

== Exhibits ==
=== Polar Bear World - Franz Josef Land ===
The polar bear exhibit is located in the Franz Josef Land facility, which features a pool that allows visitors to observe the bears swimming underwater. The facility spans 1,700 square metres. The name pays tribute to the successful expedition to the Arctic achieved by Austria-Hungary in the 1870s. The visitor centre, known as the Polar Dome, has been designated an "Arctic Ambassador Centre" by Polar Bears International.

=== Polarium ===
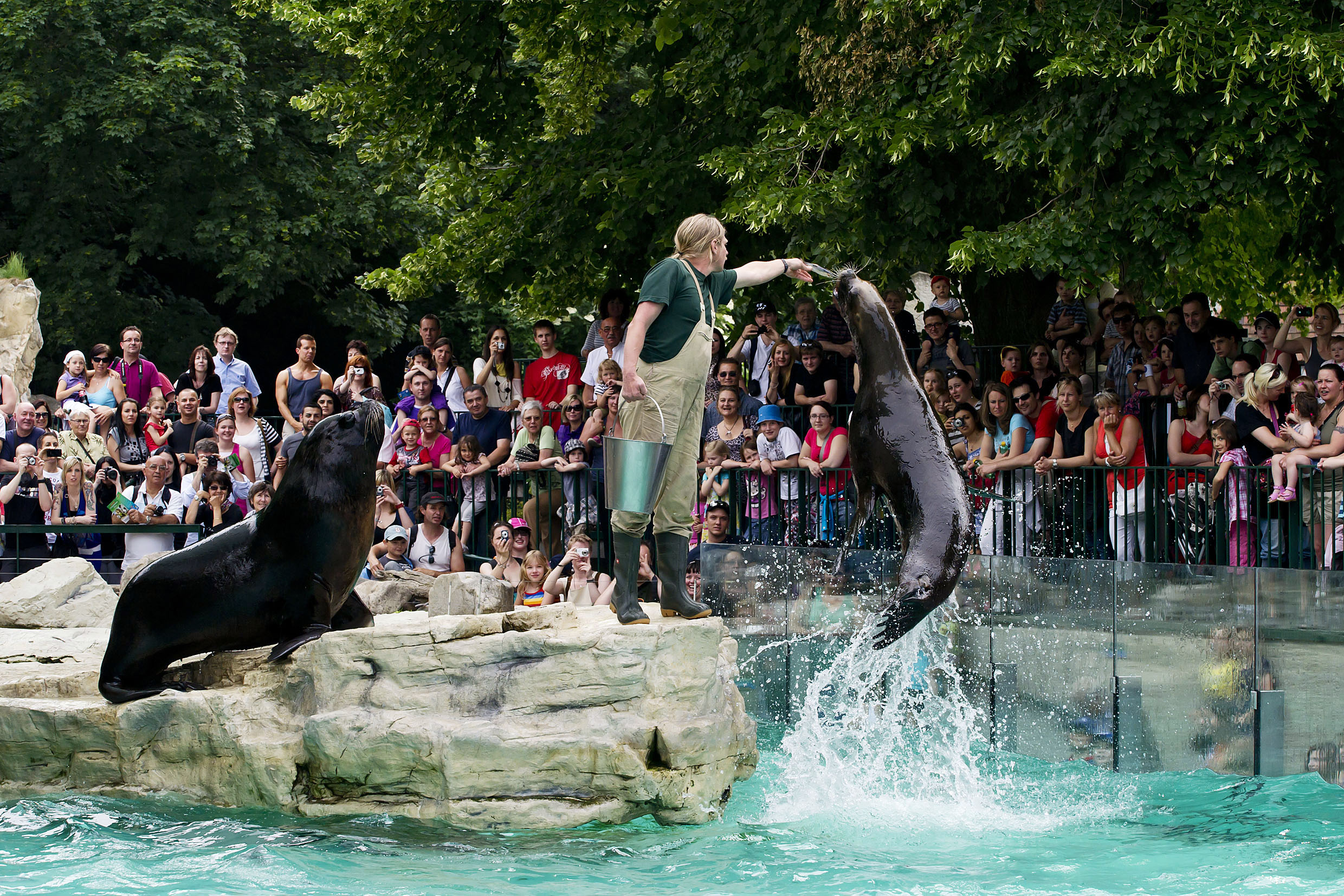
South American sea lion being fed

The Polarium, for cold water animals, is home to South American sea lions and penguins. Through a 13-metre-long pool window, one can see the maned seals swimming. During feeding sessions, the animals climb onto the rocks and jump into the water to catch fish.

For the king and rockhopper penguins, the seasonal light and climate conditions of their native habitats are simulated: approximately 10°C indoors and 8°C in the water.

=== Rainforest House ===
The Rainforest House exhibit opened in 2002, marking the zoo's 250th anniversary. Inside the glass house is an imitation of a mountain slope from a Southeast Asian rainforest. This area houses rare species such as northern river terrapins, Asian small-clawed otters, various birds, flying foxes, and Fiji banded iguanas. Temperatures are maintained at a minimum of 25 °C, and humidity remains above 80% year-round. After more than 20 years of exposure to humid conditions, the Rainforest House requires extensive renovation. It is scheduled to reopen in 2025 with a new concept.

=== ORANG.erie ===
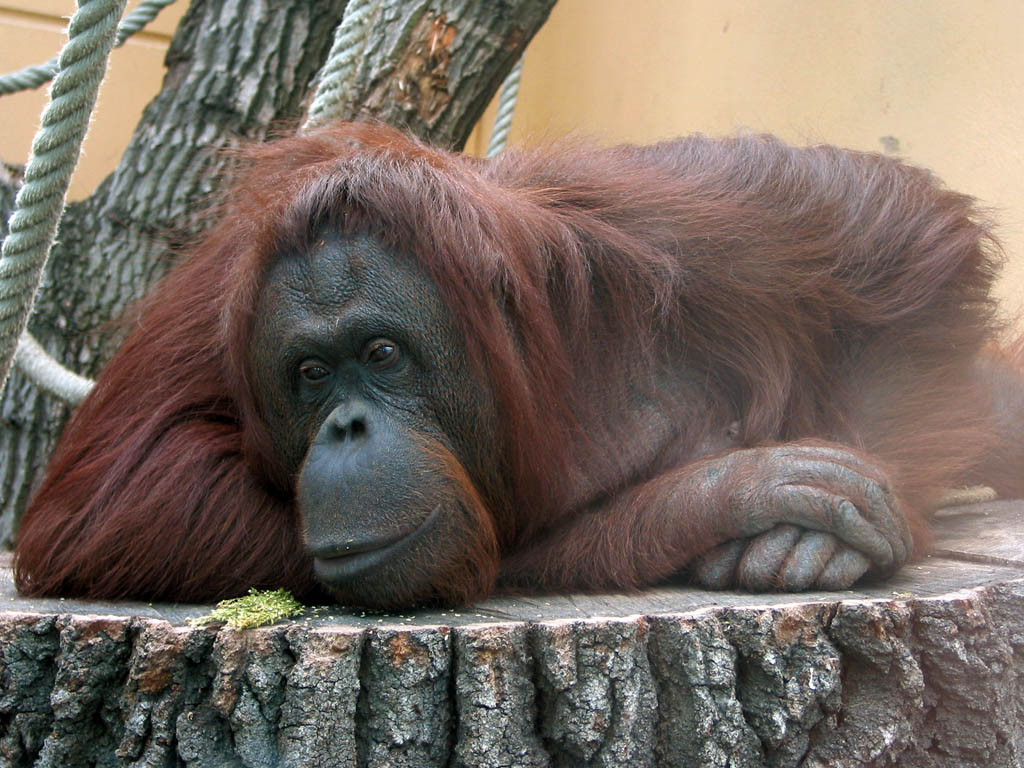
Nonja in the orangutan habitat

Now called the ORANG.erie, the first Palm House, which was built in the 19th century under Emperor Franz Joseph I and used as a film studio from 1920, was revitalised in 2009 and has been home to the orangutans since then. Reproductions of the works by Nonja, a female orangutan, are on display at "Atelier Nonja", the adjacent café-restaurant. Nonja is famous for the paintings she created with the paints and brushes given to her in the 1990s.

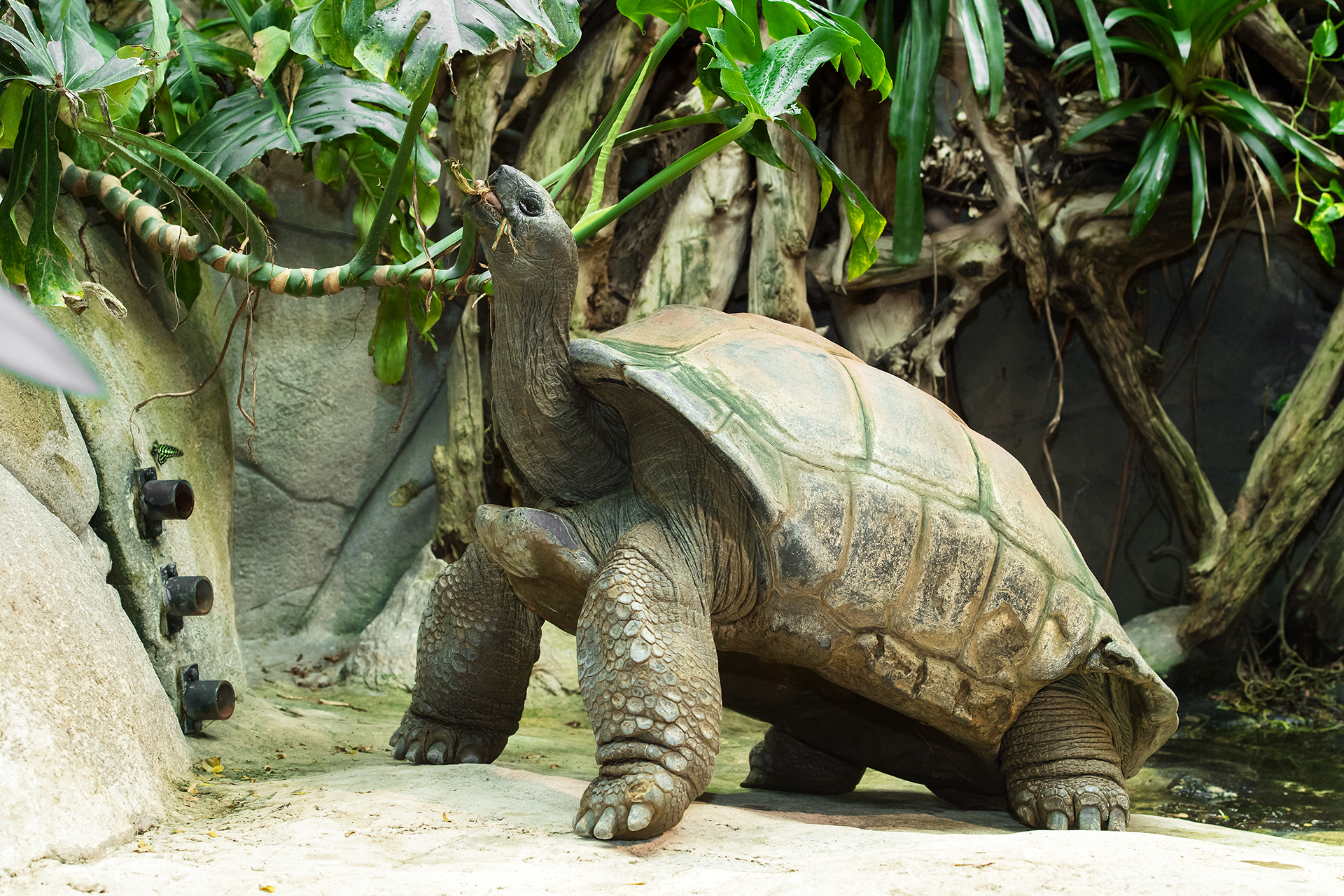
Giant tortoise Schurli lived at Schönbrunn Zoo from 1953 until her death in 2021. She was estimated to have been around 130 years old.

=== Insectarium ===
The Insectarium opened in 2005 and originally displayed insects known for their camouflage and deceptive abilities in 14 different terrariums. In 2023, remodelling began. Upon completion, the house will provide shelter primarily for reptiles rescued by the zoo from the illegal wildlife trade.

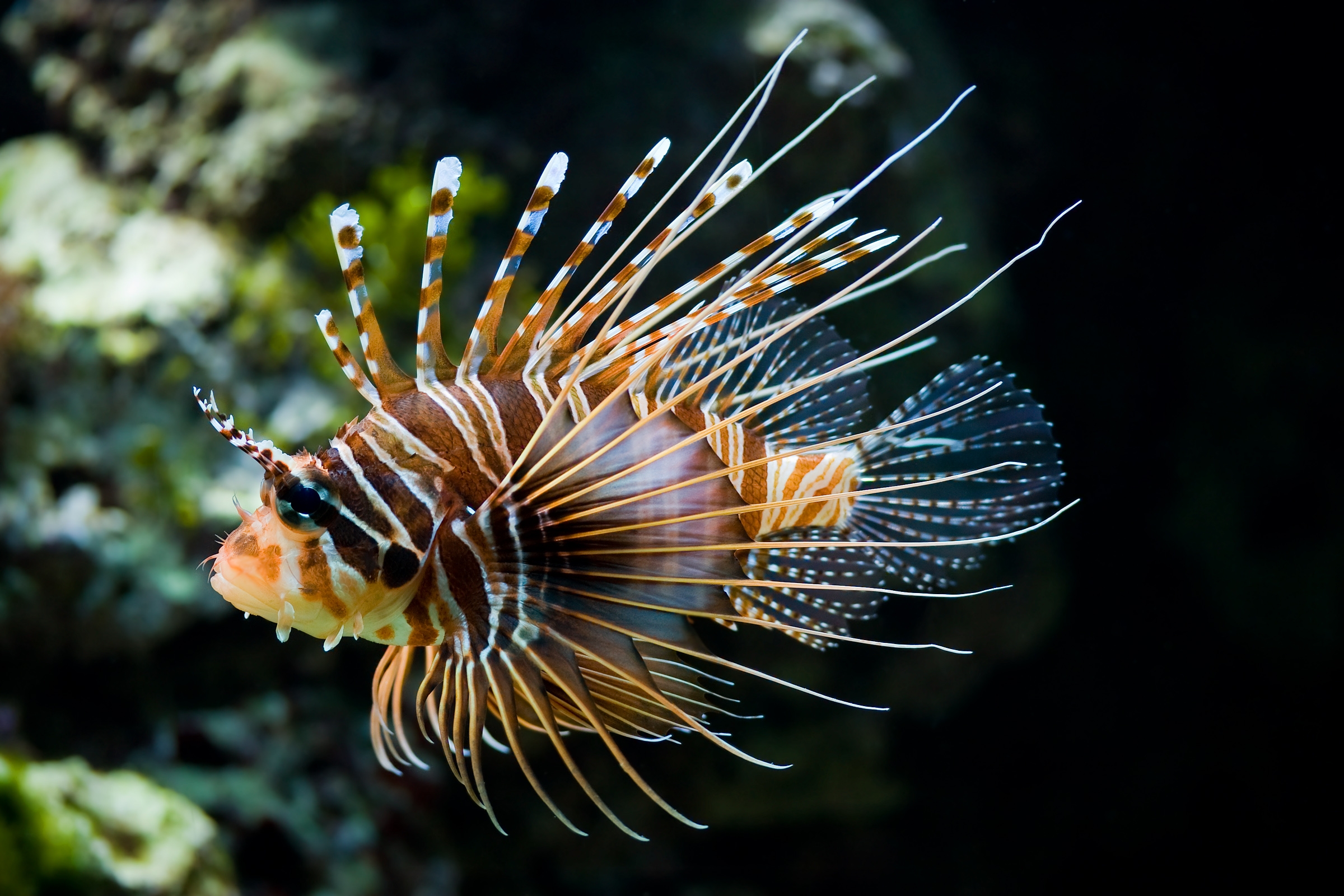
A lionfish in the aquarium

=== Aquarium and Terrarium House ===
Visitors enter the Aquarium and Terrarium House through the crocodile pavilion. Species kept in the aquarium include piranhas, lionfish, moray eels, jellyfish, and rays, as well as a large coral reef with hundreds of Indo-Pacific fish. A tunnel aquarium with arapaimas leads to the terrarium building where snakes, iguanas, Aldabra giant tortoises, and other reptiles reside.

The construction of the new Schönbrunn Conservation Aquarium at the site of the existing aquarium near the entrance at Hietzing is set to begin in 2025. A new building is necessary as the existing structure has reached the end of its service life, and refurbishment was considered impractical for both operational and economic reasons. The aquarium, which will be the biggest in Austria, will provide insights into the conservation breeding of critically endangered species outside of their natural habitats, further emphasising the zoo's commitment to wildlife conservation. The new Schönbrunn Conservation Aquarium is scheduled to open in 2028.

=== Tirolerhof ===
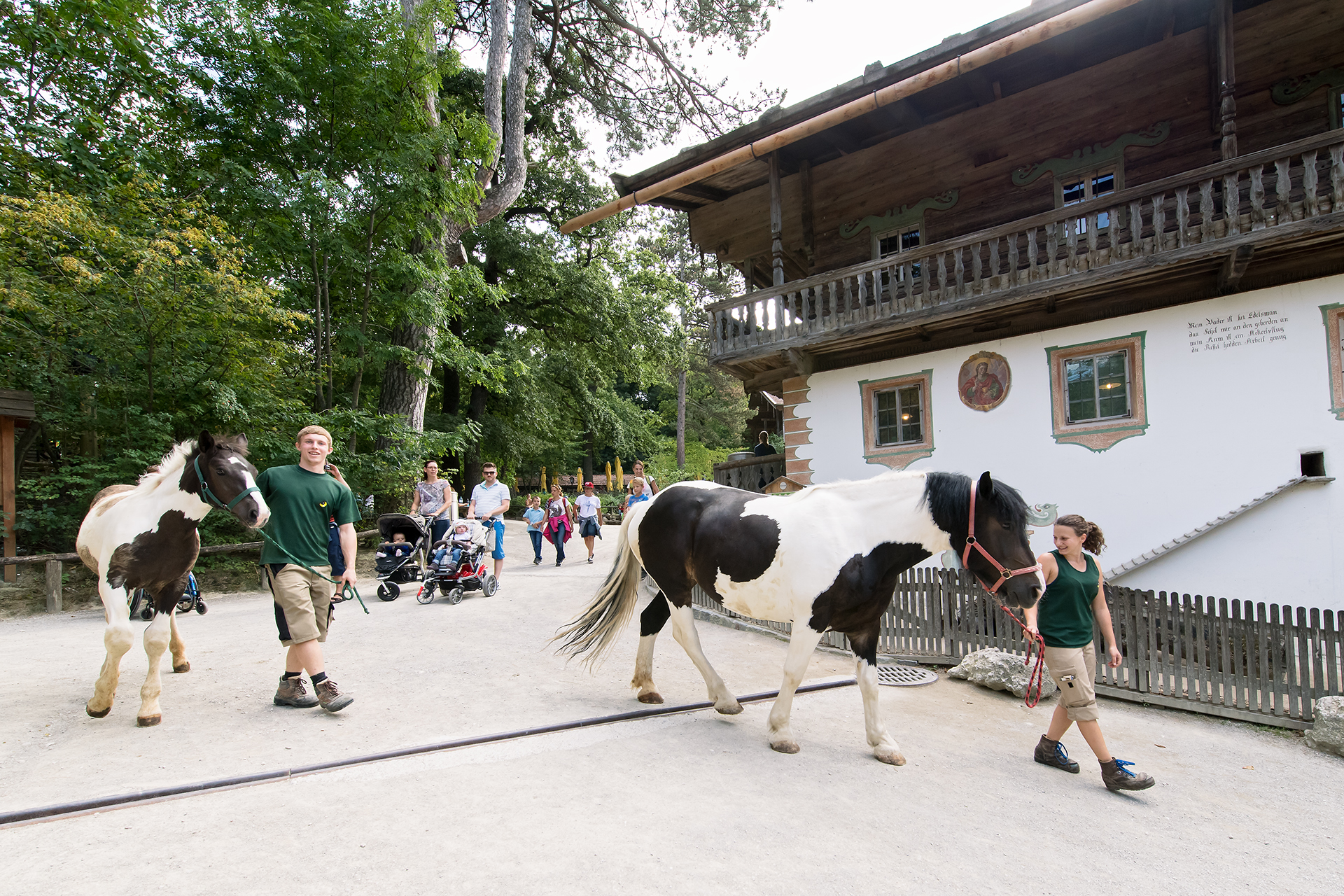
Endangered breeds of farm animals are kept at the typical Tyrolean farm.

The Haidachhof, a two-storey Lower Inn Valley farmhouse dating back to 1722, is a listed building that was dismantled at its original location in Brandenberg, Tyrol, and rebuilt at the zoo. Endangered breeds of farm animals such as Tux-Zillertal, Pustertaler Sprinzen and Original Braunvieh cattle, Noriker horses, Carinthian sheep, Tauernscheck goats and Sulmtaler chickens have been kept here in the stables since then.

=== Nature Discovery Trail ===
The Nature Discovery Trail is a path leading from the Tirolerhof up to 10 metres into the tree canopy, allowing visitors to observe native bird species. The forest path continues past outdoor terrariums with native reptiles and amphibians. The world of native fish is presented in large aquariums in the 'Am Wasser' (At the Waterside) section.

=== South America Park ===
Giant anteaters, capybaras, vicuñas and greater rheas are exhibited together in the South America Park. The outdoor area has been laid out to resemble a pampas landscape with hills and ponds.

=== Pet Park ===
The Pet Park nearby keeps small domestic animals such as rabbits and guinea pigs that visitors are allowed to interact with.

=== Big Cat House ===
The Big Cat House houses indoor enclosures for Amur leopards and Siberian tigers. Each species enjoys a large landscaped outdoor area adjacent to the building, including raised platforms, ponds, and shrubs for concealment.

=== Birdhouse ===
The Birdhouse features two halls presenting different landscapes and their native wildlife: the African savannah and the South American tropics with dozens of birds in a lush jungle habitat. The central hall is home to the zoo's Linnaeus's two-toed sloths.

=== Rat House ===
The Rat House is home to fancy rats and Gambian pouched rats. Special lighting technology has been installed to adapt the rhythms of the day and night so that visitors can observe the nocturnal rodents climbing, bathing and burrowing.

=== Monkey House ===
The historic Monkey House building, which dates back to 1841, is home to king colobus monkeys, meerkats, red ruffed lemurs, pygmy marmosets, common squirrel monkeys, emperor tamarins, and Goeldi's marmosets.

=== Rhino Park ===
Two Indian rhinos reside in Rhino Park, which spans 6,000 square metres, alongside other Asian native species such as nilgais, Indochinese sika deer and blackbucks.

=== Giraffe House ===
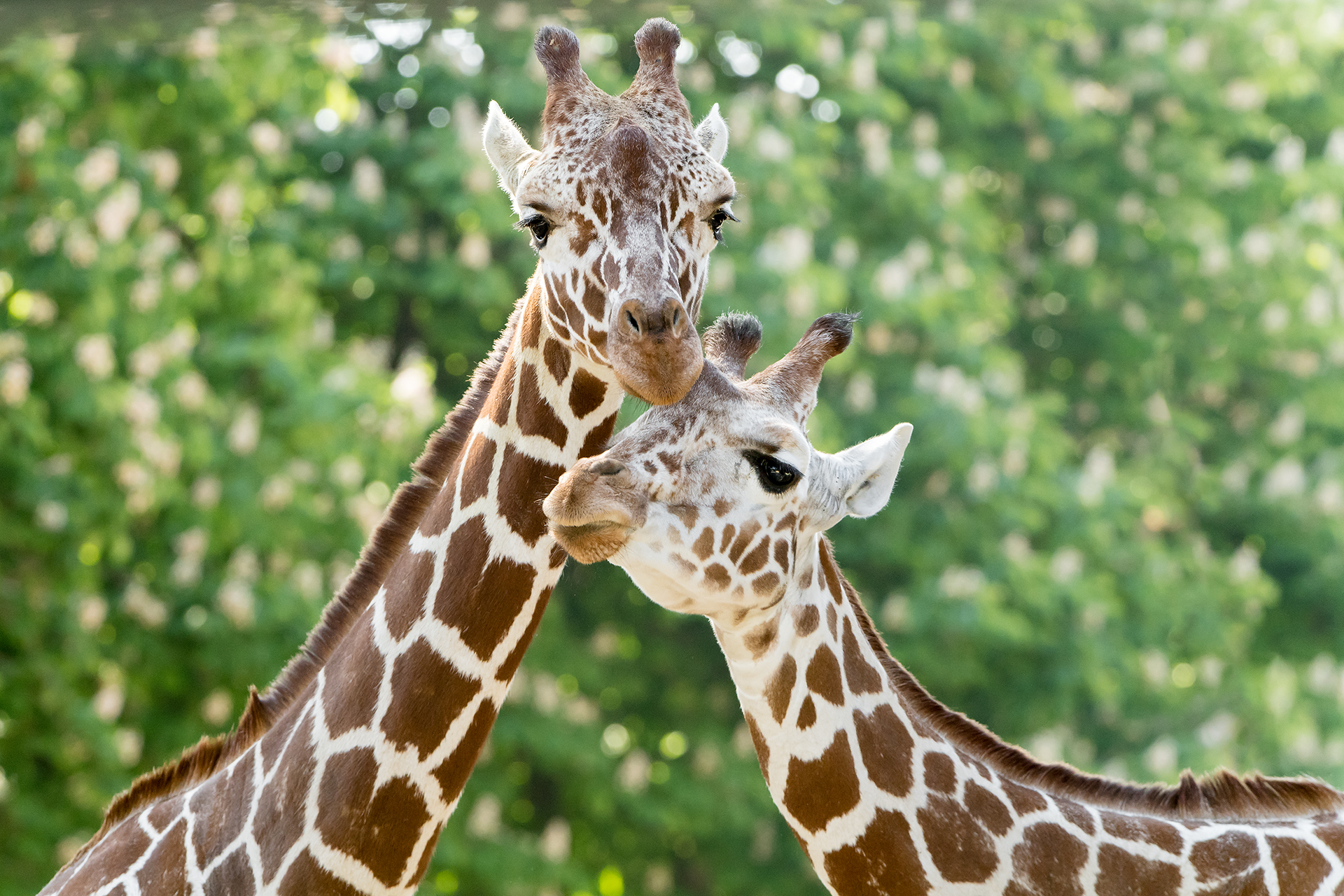
Reticulated giraffes in the giraffe house

The historic Giraffe House was restored in 2017. A winter garden was added at the rear of the building to provide additional space for the giraffes during the winter months. The photovoltaic system incorporated into the glass roof produces all the electricity needed for the enclosure. A layer of gravel in the basement stores heat accumulated during the day for night-time heating. The zoo received the City of Vienna's environmental prize for its use of these technologies.

=== East Africa House ===
The East Africa House is home to smaller species from the same habitat as giraffes, such as common dwarf mongooses, Von der Decken's hornbills, which forage together in the wild, and southern ground hornbills, which share the same outdoor enclosure as the giraffes.

=== Giant pandas ===
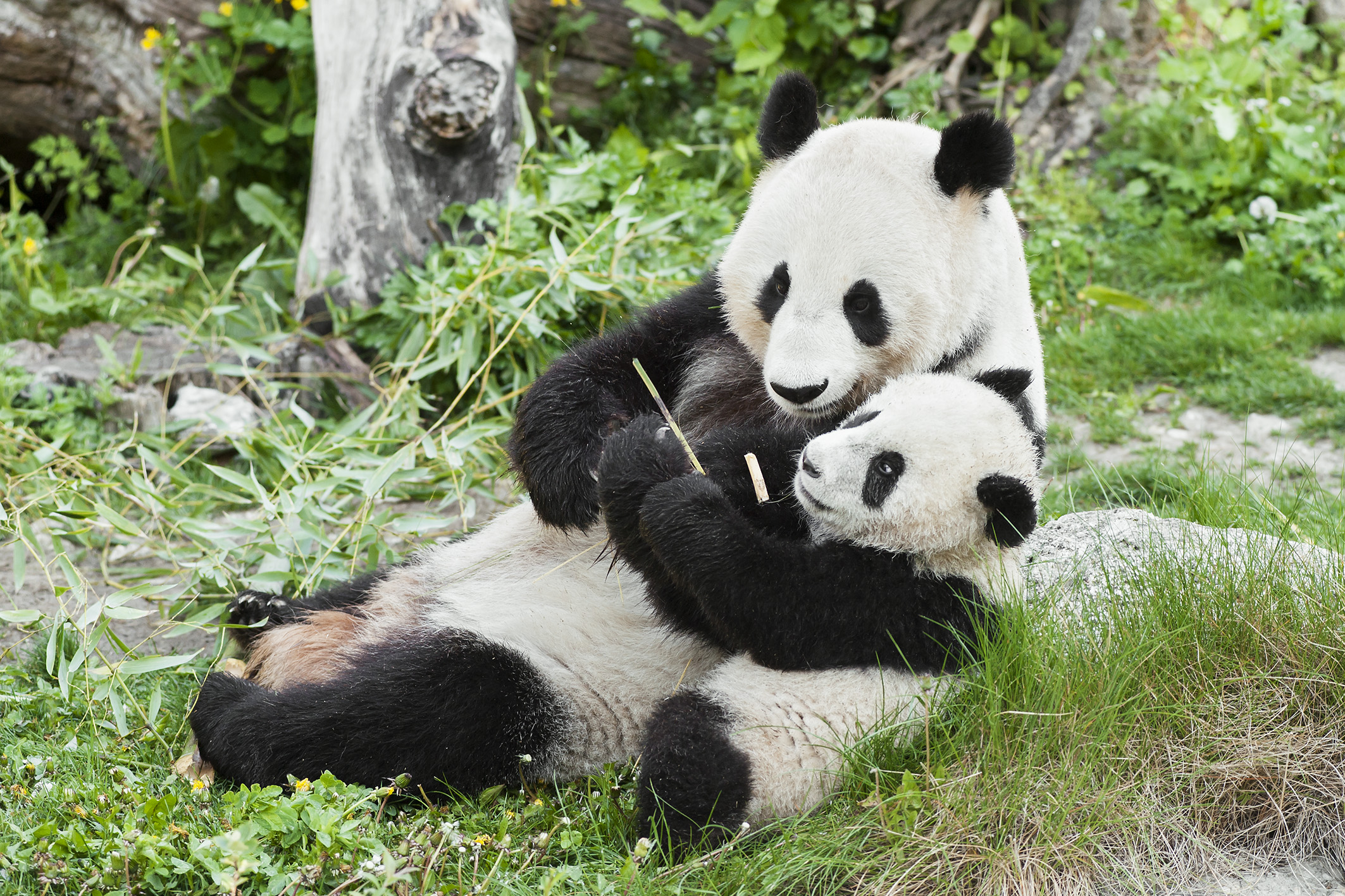
Panda Yang Yang, with Fu Long, her first cub

Schönbrunn Zoo is one of few zoos in Europe that is able to boast giant pandas as an attraction. The female Yang Yang (阳阳, 'Sunshine') and the male Long Hui (龙辉, 'Sign of the Dragon') arrived in 2003 and are known for successful breeding.

Yang Yang gave birth to the first panda cub (a male) to be conceived naturally and not via artificial insemination in Europe on 23 August 2007. In accordance with traditions in China, it was named 100 days after its birth: Fu Long (福龙, 'Happy Dragon'). The second baby panda, also a male, was born at Schönbrunn exactly three years after Fu Long's birth on 23 August 2010. It was named Fu Hu (福虎, 'Happy Tiger'). A third panda cub, another male, was born on 14 August 2013. It was named Fu Bao (福豹, 'Happy Leopard'). These were followed by twins, which were born on 7 August 2016, and named Fu Feng (福凤, 'Happy Phoenix') and Fu Ban (福伴, 'Happy Companion'). Yang Yang was the first panda in captivity to raise twins without the help of her keepers. The cubs were transferred to China to zoos or panda breeding stations at the age of two.

Long Hui died in December 2016 as a result of a tumour.

A new male panda, Yuan Yuan, arrived at the zoo in April 2019.

The research cooperation was extended for another ten years in 2024. That September, the pair living at Schönbrunn Zoo returned to China to spend their retirement there.

In 2025, a new pair of giant pandas arrived at Tiergarten Schönbrunn. The female, Lan Yun, and the male, He Feng, have been on view to visitors since May 2025.

During the period when the panda enclosure was unoccupied, it was extensively modernised and expanded.

=== Desert House ===
The Desert House is located just outside the zoo entrance, opposite the Palm House. A circuit trail leads through a desert habitat featuring rattlesnakes, naked mole-rats, vibrant birds, and other desert animals. The botanical focus includes cacti and other succulents.

== Wildlife conservation projects ==
Schönbrunn Zoo participates in international breeding programmes for the purposes of wildlife conservation. It is responsible here within the scope of the EAZA Ex-situ Programme for maintaining the studbook for the southern and northern rockhopper penguins as well as the Fiji banded iguana.

=== Giant pandas ===
Schönbrunn Zoo cooperates with the China Wildlife Conservation Association (CWCA) in its efforts to protect giant pandas. Joint research activities, conservation breeding, regular training courses, the establishment of panda reserves and the reforestation of bamboo forests are regarded as some of the most important pillars of the project.

=== Northern bald ibis ===
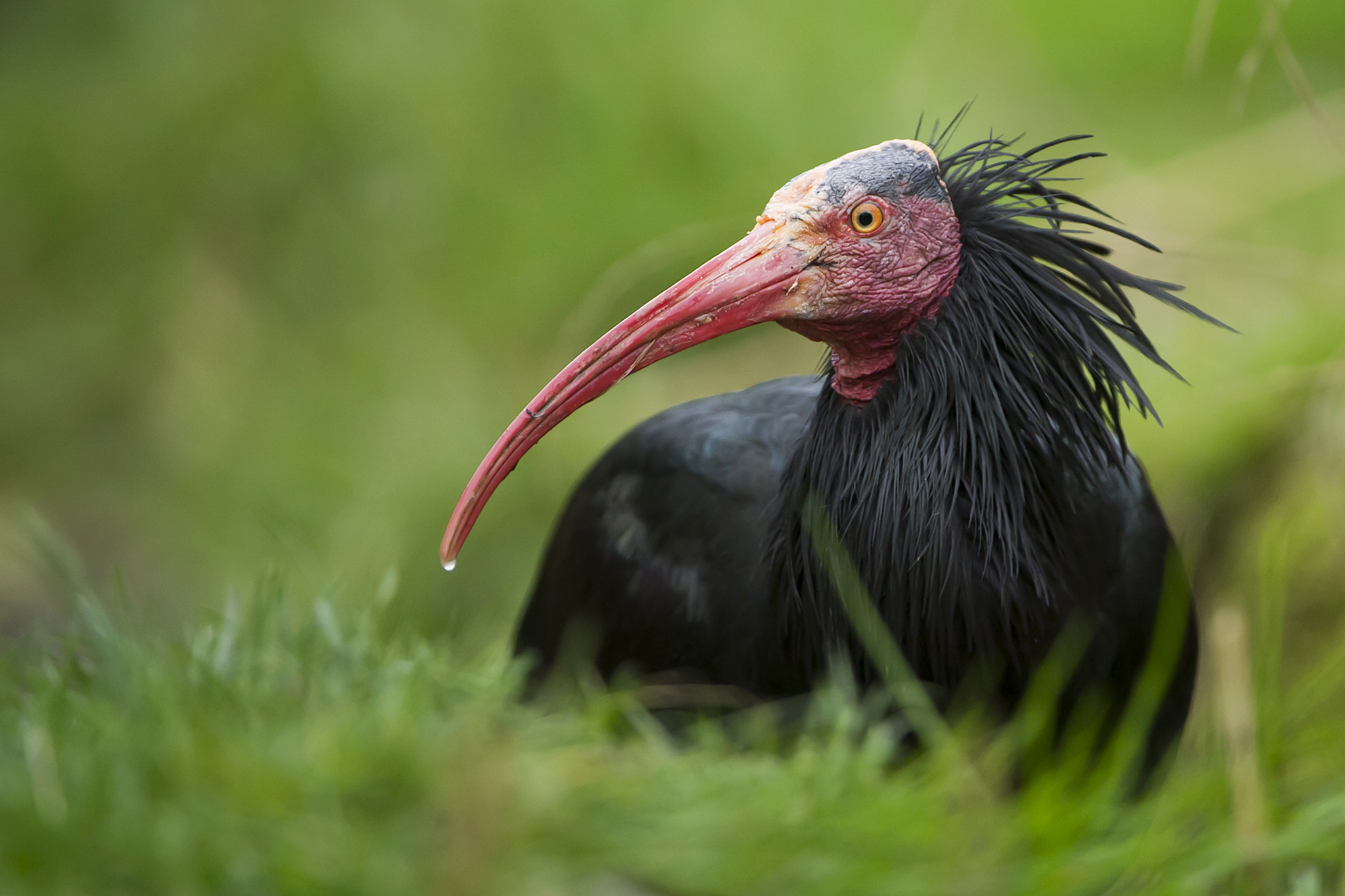
The northern bald ibis, once native to central Europe, is being reintroduced.

Schönbrunn Zoo is a partner to the team that is working within a European Life+ project to reintroduce the northern bald ibis, which is a highly endangered species, to central Europe. These birds' chicks that are hatched in zoos and wildlife parks are imprinted on human foster parents, who then use ultralight aircraft to teach the birds how to navigate to suitable overwintering quarters.

=== Northern river terrapin ===
Northern river terrapins belong to the three rarest species of turtle in the world. Schönbrunn Zoo was the first to successfully breed these terrapins in captivity in 2010. The zoo has – in addition to its important breeding efforts – also initiated a rescue mission in Bangladesh.

=== Polar bears ===
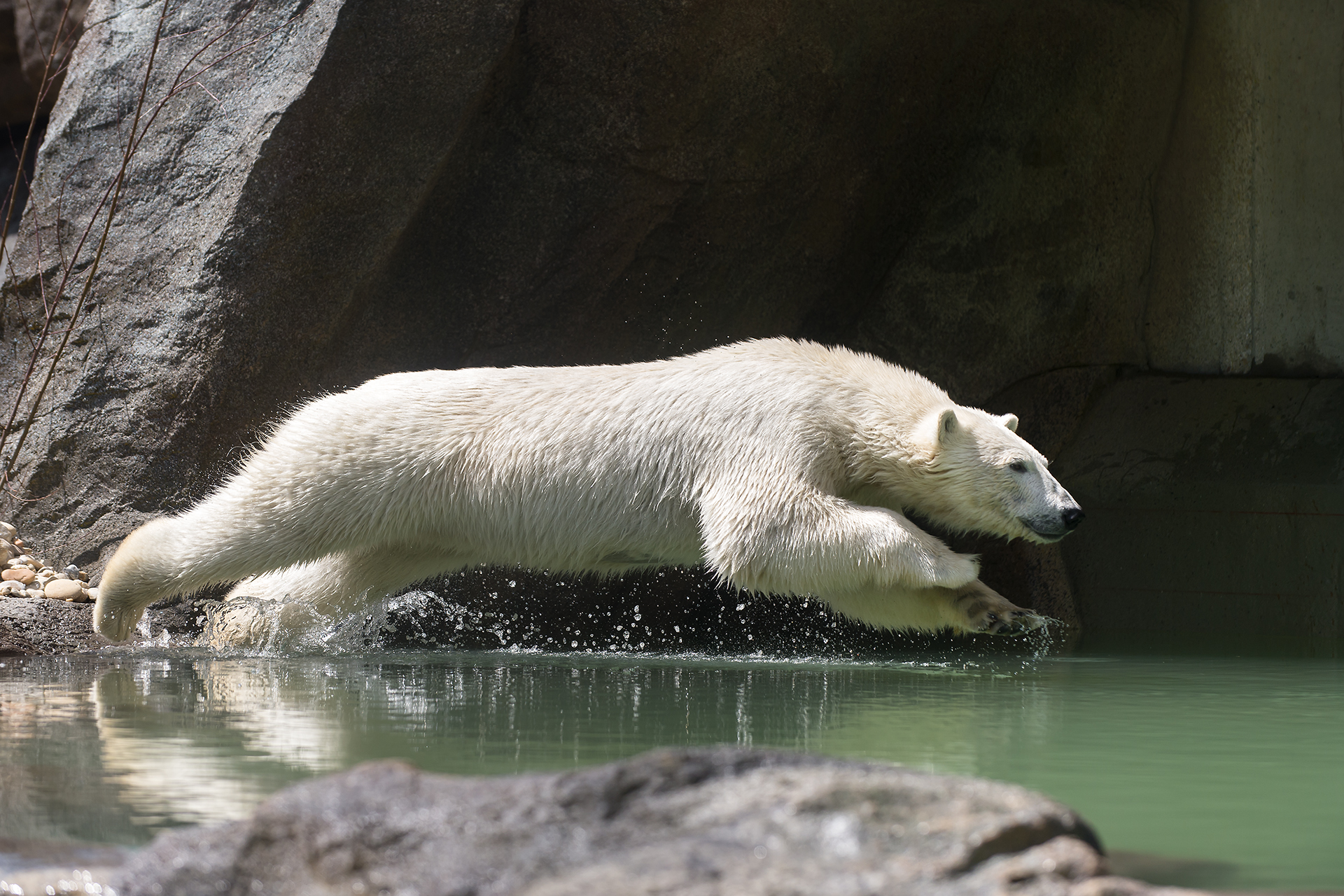
The polar bears at the zoo are ambassadors for their endangered relatives in the wild.

The zoo supports Polar Bears International (PBI), an initiative to save polar bears. The PBI researches how polar bears live in their native habitats. Transmitters are fitted to animals in the wild to track their migratory routes, which have changed due to the disappearing pack ice.

=== Barbary apes ===
The zoo also supports the Barbary Macaque Awareness and Conservation (BMAC) wildlife conservation project in Morocco, which runs educational programmes and is working to reintroduce illegally captured Barbary macaques to the wild.

=== Brazilian tapirs ===
As part of a research project in the Pantanal in South America, collar transmitters provide information about what tapirs need to survive. The project also keeps local residents informed about the animal world.

=== Pond turtles ===
European pond turtles are the only species of turtle that is native to Austria. The zoo is working with the Donau-Auen National Park, where the last intact population in Austria lives, to protect the clutches.

=== Bearded vultures ===
Bearded vultures were wiped out at the beginning of the 20th century. Animals have been successfully reintroduced from breeding programmes such as those that have taken place at Schönbrunn Zoo since the 1980s.

=== Ural owl ===
Habitat loss resulted in the extinction of the Ural owl in Austria. Living conditions have improved again and so a decision was made to launch a reintroduction project, which Schönbrunn Zoo is supporting with, among other things, chicks from its breeding programmes. Several hundred birds have already been released into the wild.

== Significant breeding successes ==
The five giant panda cubs were the first in Europe to be born as a result of natural conception. Yang Yang was the world's first panda in captivity to raise twins without help from her keepers.

A female anteater was also able to successfully raise her twins for the first time in the world at a zoo in 2000.

The first elephant calf to be conceived with the help of artificial insemination using frozen semen was born at the zoo in 2013.

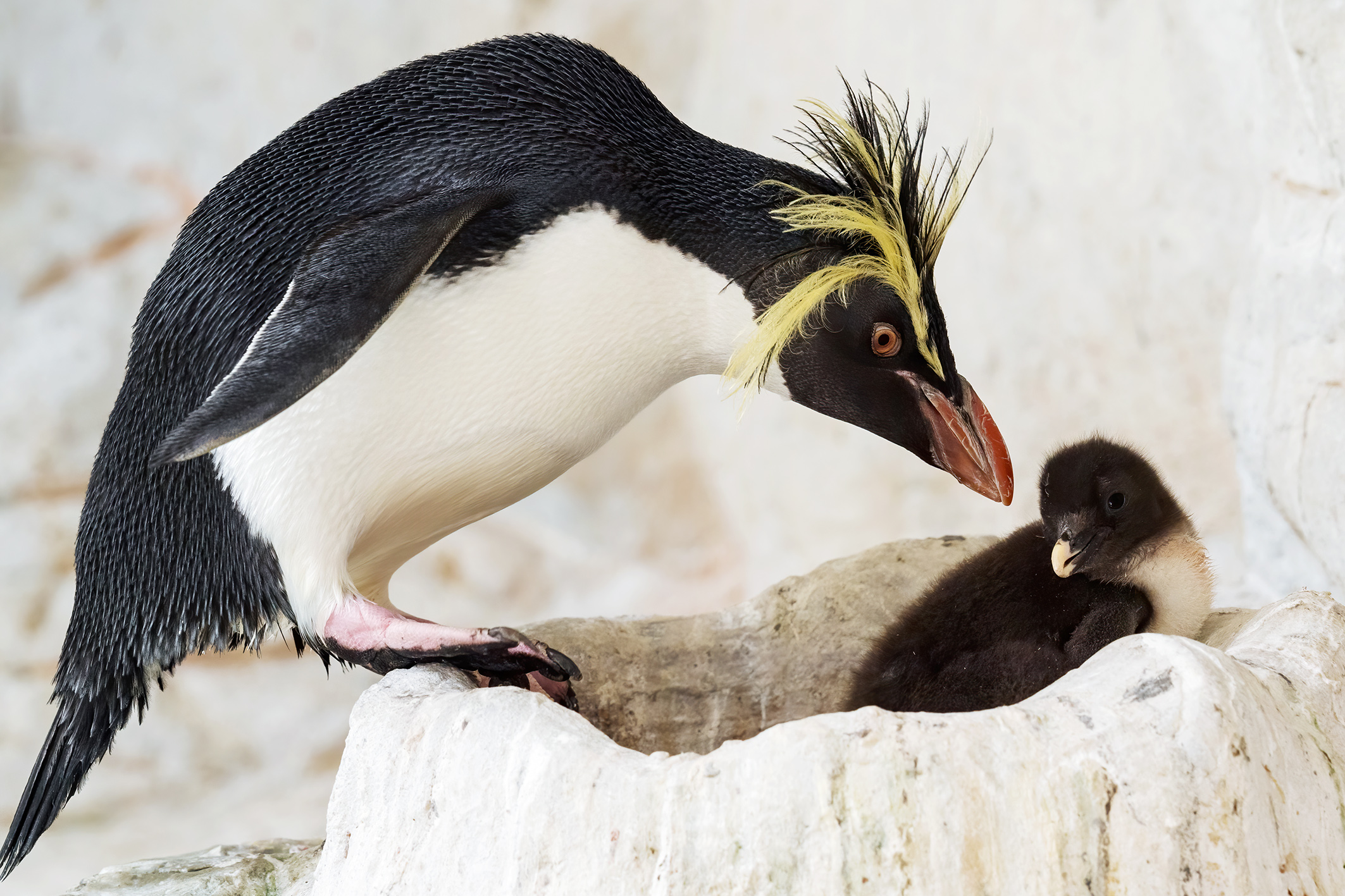
Northern rockhopper penguins breed successfully every year.

Schönbrunn Zoo is the only zoo in Europe to successfully breed the endangered northern rockhopper penguins every year.

First conservation breeding successes in the world

- 2010 Northern river terrapin (Batagur baska)
- 2011 Bornean rock frog species Staurois guttatus and Staurois parvus
- 2012 South American snapping turtle (Chelydra acutirostris)
- 2015 Gigant jellyfish (Rhizostoma luteum)
- 2015 Green keel-bellied lizard (Gastropholis prasina)
- 2016 Broadley's flat lizard (Platysaurus broadleyi)

== Company data ==
Zoologist Stephan Hering-Hagenbeck has been the zoo's sole managing director since 1 January 2020. Ana Haschka is the company officer with statutory authority. The members of the Supervisory Board are Wolfgang Schüssel, Elke Koch, Monika Geppl, Alexander Palma, Alexander Keller and Thomas Sedlak. Schönbrunner Tiergarten-Gesellschaft m.b.H. is a shareholder in Tiergarten Schönbrunn Gastronomie GmbH and a limited partner in Dipl. Tzt. Thomas Voracek KG Tierärztliche Ordination Tiergarten Schönbrunn.

Schönbrunner Tiergarten-Gesellschaft m.b.H. has been registered in the commercial register under the number 47954x since 30 December 1991, the capital contribution amounts to €600,000.00 and is solely owned by the Republic of Austria, represented by the Federal Ministry for Digital and Economic Affairs.The company further operates the Desert House at the gates of the zoo in conjunction with the Österreichische Bundesgärten (Austrian Federal Gardens) in the form of the ‘ARGE Sonnenuhrhaus’ (‘Joint Venture Sundial House’).

The zoo has been certified by TÜV Süd since 2015 in accordance with international standards ISO 9001 (quality management), ISO 14001 (environmental management) and ISO 45001 (occupational health and safety).

Basic data
Title:	Schönbrunner Tiergartengesetz (Schönbrunn Zoo Act)
Long title:	Bundesgesetz über die Errichtung einer Schönbrunner Tiergarten-Gesellschaft m. b. H. (Federal law governing the establishment of a Schönbrunn limited liability company)
Type:	Federal law
Scope of application:	Republic of Austria
Reference:	BGBl. Nr. 420/1991 (Stf.)
Last amendment:	BGBl. Nr. 46/2014 (Federal Legal Gazette No. 46/2014)
Legal text:	ris.bka
Please note the reference to the current version of the law.

== Literature ==
- Mitchell G. Ash, Lothar Dittrich (Hrsg.): Menagerie des Kaisers. Zoo der Wiener. Pichler, Wien 2002, ISBN 3-85431-269-5.
- Gerhard Heindl: Start in die Moderne. Die kaiserliche Menagerie unter Alois Kraus. Braumüller, Wien 2006, ISBN 3-7003-1540-6.
- Gerhard Kunze: Tiergarten Schönbrunn. Zoo der glücklichen Tiere. Österreichs magischer Kraftort. Holzhausen, Wien 2005, ISBN 3-85493-102-6.
- Gerhard Kunze: Tiergarten Schönbrunn: von der Menagerie des Kaisers zu Helmut Pechlaners Zoo der glücklichen Tiere. LW Werbe- und Verlagsgesellschaft, Wien 2001, ISBN 3-9501179-0-3.
- E. Minoggio: Mit Kinderaugen Tiere sehen. Ein Kinder-Zooführer durch den Tiergarten Schönbrunn. Manz, Wien 2004, ISBN 3-7067-0014-X.
- Sigrid Laube, Maria Blazejovsky: Zoogeschichten. Jungbrunnen, Wien 2002, ISBN 3-7026-5740-1.
- Oliver E. Paget: Tierisch heiter. Ein historisch-kulturell-tierischer Rundgang. Stangl, Wien 2002, ISBN 3-934969-21-6.
- Helmut Pechlaner, Gaby V. Schwammer: Zooführer. Schönbrunner Tiergarten, Wien 2006, ISBN 3-902243-14-7.
- Helmut Pechlaner, Dagmar Schratter, Gerhard Heindl (Hrsg.): Tiergarten Schönbrunn. Geschichte. Braumüller, Wien 2005, ISSN 1994-5116
- Helmut Pechlaner: Meine Schönbrunner Tiergeschichten. Holzhausen, Wien 1997, ISBN 3-900518-68-8.
- Christa Riedl-Dorn: Hohes Tier. Die Geschichte der ersten Giraffe in Schönbrunn. Braumüller, Wien 2008, ISBN 3-7003-1633-X.
- Dagmar Schratter (Herausgeberin), Gerhard Heindl: Tiere unterwegs. Historisches und Aktuelles über Tiererwerb und Tiertransporte. Braumüller, Wien 2007, ISBN 3-7003-1575-9.
- Dagmar Schratter, Regina Pfistermüller, Petra Stefan: Der Koala: Koalas in Schönbrunn – Austria hilft Australien. Schönbrunner Tiergarten, Wien 2002, ISBN 3-902243-01-5.
- Gaby Schwammer, Hanno Fürnwein: Die Botschaft der Regenwälder. Schönbrunner Tiergarten, Wien 2002, ISBN 3-902243-03-1.
- Daniel Zupanc, Regina Pfistermüller: Wildnis Zoo. Impressionen aus Schönbrunn. KIKO Verlag, Wien 2008, ISBN 978-3-902644-00-8.
- Gabriele Pechlaner, Helmut Pechlaner: Das Wunderwerk Zoo. 24 Stunden im Tiergarten Schönbrunn. Holzhausen Verlag, Wien 2001, ISBN 3-85493-042-9.
- Gaby Schwammer, Harald Schwammer: Im Einsatz für gefährdete Arten. Vom Tiergarten Schönbrunn um die ganze Welt. Leopold Stocker Verlag, Graz 2018, ISBN 978-3-7020-1712-5.
- Johanna Bukovsky, Daniel Zupanc: Erlebnis Zoo. Begegnungen im Tiergarten Schönbrunn, KIKO Verlag, Wien 2018, ISBN 978-3-902644-24-4.
- Johanna Bukovsky, Daniel Zupanc: Pandas. Eine Erfolgsgeschichte aus dem Tiergarten Schönbrunn, KIKO Verlag, Wien 2018, ISBN 978-3-902644-35-0.
