= Nonja =

Nonja is the name of two orangutans:

- Nonja (Malaysian orangutan), the orangutan with the longest known lifespan
- Nonja (Austrian orangutan), an orangutan residing at the Vienna Zoo
