= Nonja (Austrian orangutan) =

Female orangutan (1976–2018)

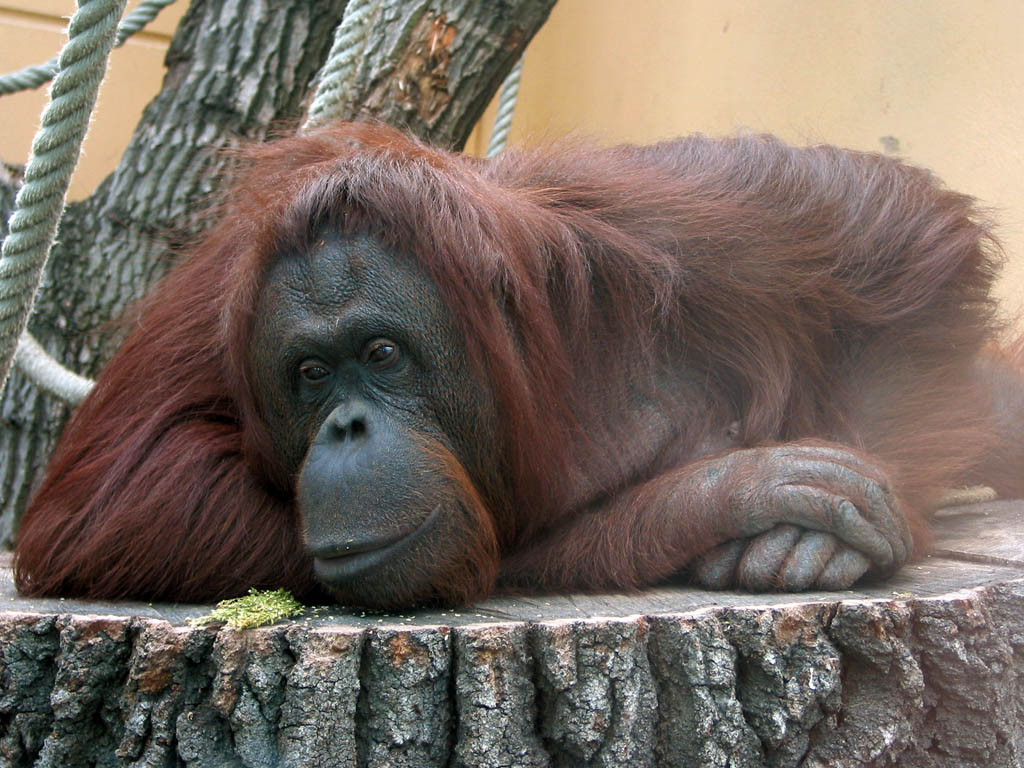
- Nonja (2004)
- Species: orangutan
- Sex: female
- Born: April 21, 1976; Tiergarten Schönbrunn, Vienna
- Died: May 22, 2018 (aged 42)
- Cause of death: euthanized, kidney dysfunction
- Known for: Photography, painting

Nonja (21 April 1976 – 22 May 2018) was a female orangutan at Tiergarten Schönbrunn (Vienna Zoo) who had her own Facebook page. The zoo provided her with a special camera, enabling her to take digital pictures, which subsequently were uploaded to her Facebook page.

Nonja was born at Tiergarten Schönbrunn in Vienna and grew up with her mother. However she was raised by the zoo's personnel as well. At some point when she was with her stockmen, Nonja picked up a brush and made some attempts to paint. After that incident the zoo provided her for a while with a regular opportunity to play with painting utensils. The zoo managed to sell some of her creations for up to 2000 euros.

In 2009, the zoo provided Nonja with a special camera with a Wi-Fi connection and encouraged her to take pictures in her enclosure. The camera was a special shock-proof one and released a raisin when a picture was taken. The pictures taken by Nonja were automatically uploaded to her Facebook page, which had several thousand visitors per day.

In May 2018 Nonja developed a severe kidney dysfunction, which could not be remedied by medical treatment, hence it was decided to put her down to avoid unnecessary suffering.
