= List of birds of Austria =

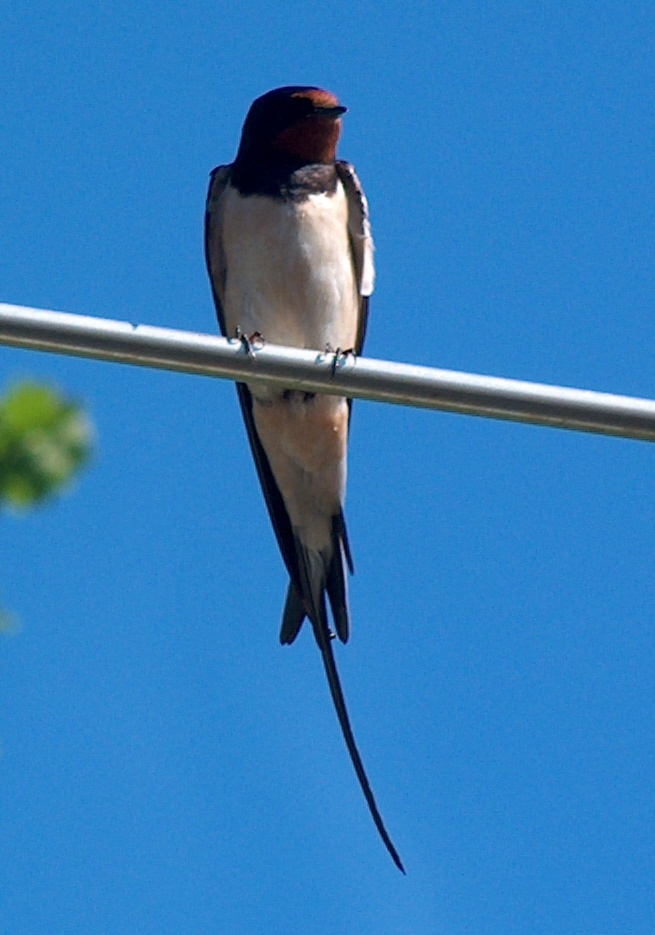
The barn swallow is the national bird of Austria.

This is a list of the bird species recorded in Austria. The avifauna of Austria included a total of 458 species as of July 2023 according to the Avifaunistic Commission of BirdLife Austria (Avifaunistische Kommission, AFK) with supplemental additions from Avibase. Of them, 9 have been introduced by humans. Eighteen species have not been recorded in the wild since 1950.

This list's taxonomic treatment (designation and sequence of orders, families and species) and nomenclature (English and scientific names) are those of The Clements Checklist of Birds of the World, 2022 edition.

The following tags are used in the status column to define several categories of occurrence; the definitions are those of the AFK.

- A: Accidental – species having "either less than 15 records in total or a maximum of 5 records [since 1997] irrespective of the total number of records"
- H: Historical – "Recorded in a wild state in Austria only between 1800 and 31 December 1949."
- I: Introduced – "Established in Austria as self-sustaining breeding species by man."

== Ducks, geese, and waterfowl ==
Order: Anseriformes Family: Anatidae

Anatidae includes the ducks and most duck-like waterfowl, such as geese and swans. These birds are adapted to an aquatic existence with webbed feet, flattened bills, and feathers that are excellent at shedding water due to an oily coating.

Common name	Binomial	Status
Graylag goose	Anser anser	
Greater white-fronted goose	Anser albifrons	
Lesser white-fronted goose	Anser erythropus	A
Taiga bean-goose	Anser fabalis	
Tundra bean-goose	Anser serrirostris	
Pink-footed goose	Anser brachyrhynchus	A
Brant	Branta bernicla	A
Barnacle goose	Branta leucopsis	
Cackling goose	Branta hutchinsii	A
Canada goose	Branta canadensis	I
Red-breasted goose	Branta ruficollis	A
Mute swan	Cygnus olor	
Tundra swan	Cygnus columbianus	
Whooper swan	Cygnus cygnus	
Egyptian goose	Alopochen aegyptiacus	I
Ruddy shelduck	Tadorna ferruginea	H I
Common shelduck	Tadorna tadorna	
Wood duck	Aix sponsa	I
Mandarin duck	Aix galericulata	I
Baikal teal	Sibirionetta formosa	A
Garganey	Spatula querquedula	
Blue-winged teal	Spatula discors	A
Northern shoveler	Spatula clypeata	
Gadwall	Mareca strepera	
Falcated duck	Mareca falcata	A H
Eurasian wigeon	Mareca penelope	
American wigeon	Mareca americana	A
Mallard	Anas platyrhynchos	
Northern pintail	Anas acuta	
Green-winged teal	Anas crecca	
Marbled teal	Marmaronetta angustirostris	A
Red-crested pochard	Netta rufina	
Common pochard	Aythya ferina	
Ring-necked duck	Aythya collaris	A
Ferruginous duck	Aythya nyroca	
Tufted duck	Aythya fuligula	
Greater scaup	Aythya marila	
Common eider	Somateria mollissima	
Harlequin duck	Histrionicus histrionicus	A
Velvet scoter	Melanitta fusca	
Common scoter	Melanitta nigra	
Long-tailed duck	Clangula hyemalis	
Common goldeneye	Bucephala clangula	
Smew	Mergellus albellus	
Common merganser	Mergus merganser	
Red-breasted merganser	Mergus serrator	A
Ruddy duck	Oxyura jamaicensis	A I
White-headed duck	Oxyura leucocephala	A

== Pheasants, grouse, and allies ==
Order: Galliformes Family: Phasianidae

These are terrestrial species of gamebirds, feeding and nesting on the ground. They are variable in size but generally plump, with broad and relatively short wings.

Common name	Binomial	Status
Hazel grouse	Tetrastes bonasia	
Rock ptarmigan	Lagopus muta	
Western capercaillie	Tetrao urogallus	
Black grouse	Lyrurus tetrix	
Gray partridge	Perdix perdix	
Ring-necked pheasant	Phasianus colchicus	I
Common quail	Coturnix coturnix	
Rock partridge	Alectoris graeca	

== Flamingos ==
Order: Phoenicopteriformes Family: Phoenicopteridae

Flamingos are gregarious wading birds, usually 3 to 5 feet (91 to 152 cm) high, found in both the Western and Eastern Hemispheres. Flamingos filter-feed on shellfish and algae. Their oddly shaped beaks are specially adapted to separate mud and silt from the food they consume and, uniquely, are used upside-down.

Common name	Binomial	Status
Greater flamingo	Phoenicopterus roseus	

== Grebes ==
Order: Podicipediformes Family: Podicipedidae

Grebes are small to medium-large freshwater diving birds. They have lobed toes and are excellent swimmers and divers. However, they have their feet placed far back on the body, making them quite ungainly on land.

Common name	Binomial	Status
Little grebe	Tachybaptus ruficollis	
Horned grebe	Podiceps auritus	
Red-necked grebe	Podiceps grisegena	
Great crested grebe	Podiceps cristatus	
Eared grebe	Podiceps nigricollis	

== Pigeons and doves ==
Order: Columbiformes Family: Columbidae

Pigeons and doves are stout-bodied birds with short necks and short slender bills with a fleshy cere.

Common name	Binomial	Status
Rock pigeon	Columba livia	I
Stock dove	Columba oenas	
Common wood-pigeon	Columba palumbus	
European turtle-dove	Streptopelia turtur	
Oriental turtle-dove	Streptopelia orientalis	A
Eurasian collared-dove	Streptopelia decaocto	

== Sandgrouse ==
Order: Pterocliformes Family: Pteroclidae

Sandgrouse have small pigeon-like heads and necks, but sturdy compact bodies. They have long pointed wings and sometimes tails and a fast direct flight. Flocks fly to watering holes at dawn and dusk. Their legs are feathered down to the toes.

Common name	Binomial	Status
Pallas's sandgrouse	Syrrhaptes paradoxus	A H

== Bustards ==
Order: Otidiformes Family: Otididae

Bustards are large terrestrial birds mainly associated with dry open country and steppes in the Old World. They are omnivorous and nest on the ground. They walk steadily on strong legs and big toes, pecking for food as they go. They have long broad wings with "fingered" wingtips and striking patterns in flight. Many have interesting mating displays.

Common name	Binomial	Status
Great bustard	Otis tarda	
MacQueen's bustard	Chlamydotis macqueenii	A
Little bustard	Tetrax tetrax	extirpated

== Cuckoos ==
Order: Cuculiformes Family: Cuculidae

The family Cuculidae includes cuckoos, roadrunners, and anis. These birds are of variable size with slender bodies, long tails, and strong legs. The Old World cuckoos are brood parasites.

Common name	Binomial	Status
Great spotted cuckoo	Clamator glandarius	A
Common cuckoo	Cuculus canorus	

== Nightjars and allies ==
Order: Caprimulgiformes Family: Caprimulgidae

Nightjars are medium-sized nocturnal birds that usually nest on the ground. They have long wings, short legs, and very short bills. Most have small feet, of little use for walking, and long pointed wings. Their soft plumage is camouflaged to resemble bark or leaves.

Common name	Binomial	Status
Eurasian nightjar	Caprimulgus europaeus	

== Swifts ==
Order: Caprimulgiformes Family: Apodidae

Swifts are small birds which spend the majority of their lives flying. These birds have very short legs and never settle voluntarily on the ground, perching instead only on vertical surfaces. Many swifts have long swept-back wings which resemble a crescent or boomerang.

Common name	Binomial	Status
Alpine swift	Apus melba	
Common swift	Apus apus	
Pallid swift	Apus pallidus	A

== Rails, gallinules, and coots ==
Order: Gruiformes Family: Rallidae

Rallidae is a large family of small to medium-sized birds which includes the rails, crakes, coots, and gallinules. Typically they inhabit dense vegetation in damp environments near lakes, swamps, or rivers. In general they are shy and secretive birds, making them difficult to observe. Most species have strong legs and long toes which are well adapted to soft uneven surfaces. They tend to have short, rounded wings and to be weak fliers.

Common name	Binomial	Status
Water rail	Rallus aquaticus	
Corn crake	Crex crex	
Spotted crake	Porzana porzana	
Eurasian moorhen	Gallinula chloropus	
Eurasian coot	Fulica atra	
Western swamphen	Porphyrio porphyrio	A H
Little crake	Zapornia parva	
Baillon's crake	Zapornia pusilla	A

== Cranes ==
Order: Gruiformes Family: Gruidae

Cranes are large, long-legged, and long-necked birds. Unlike the similar-looking but unrelated herons, cranes fly with necks outstretched, not pulled back. Most have elaborate and noisy courting displays or "dances".

Common name	Binomial	Status
Demoiselle crane	Anthropoides virgo	A
Common crane	Grus grus	

== Thick-knees ==
Order: Charadriiformes Family: Burhinidae

The thick-knees are a group of waders found worldwide within the tropical zone, with some species also breeding in temperate Europe and Australia. They are medium to large waders with strong black or yellow-black bills, large yellow eyes, and cryptic plumage. Despite being classed as waders, most species have a preference for arid or semi-arid habitats.

Common name	Binomial	Status
Eurasian thick-knee	Burhinus oedicnemus	

== Stilts and avocets ==
Order: Charadriiformes Family: Recurvirostridae

Recurvirostridae is a family of large wading birds which includes the avocets and stilts. The avocets have long legs and long up-curved bills. The stilts have extremely long legs and long, thin, straight bills.

Common name	Binomial	Status
Black-winged stilt	Himantopus himantopus	
Pied avocet	Recurvirostra avosetta	

== Oystercatchers ==
Order: Charadriiformes Family: Haematopodidae

The oystercatchers are large and noisy plover-like birds, with strong bills used for smashing or prising open molluscs.

Common name	Binomial	Status
Eurasian oystercatcher	Haematopus ostralegus	

== Plovers and lapwings ==
Order: Charadriiformes Family: Charadriidae

The family Charadriidae includes the plovers, dotterels, and lapwings. They are small to medium-sized birds with compact bodies, short thick necks, and long, usually pointed, wings. They are found in open country worldwide, mostly in habitats near water.

Common name	Binomial	Status
Black-bellied plover	Pluvialis squatarola	A
European golden-plover	Pluvialis apricaria	A
American golden-plover	Pluvialis dominica	A
Pacific golden-plover	Pluvialis fulva	A
Northern lapwing	Vanellus vanellus	
Sociable lapwing	Vanellus gregarius	A
White-tailed lapwing	Vanellus leucurus	A
Greater sand-plover	Charadrius leschenaultii	A
Kentish plover	Charadrius alexandrinus	
Common ringed plover	Charadrius hiaticula	
Little ringed plover	Charadrius dubius	
Eurasian dotterel	Charadrius morinellus	

== Sandpipers and allies ==
Order: Charadriiformes Family: Scolopacidae

Scolopacidae is a large diverse family of small to medium-sized shorebirds including the sandpipers, curlews, godwits, shanks, tattlers, woodcocks, snipes, dowitchers, and phalaropes. The majority of these species eat small invertebrates picked out of the mud or soil. Variation in length of legs and bills enables multiple species to feed in the same habitat, particularly on the coast, without direct competition for food.

Common name	Binomial	Status
Whimbrel	Numenius phaeopus	A
Slender-billed curlew	Numenius tenuirostris	A
Eurasian curlew	Numenius arquata	
Bar-tailed godwit	Limosa lapponica	A
Black-tailed godwit	Limosa limosa	
Ruddy turnstone	Arenaria interpres	A
Red knot	Calidris canutus	A
Ruff	Calidris pugnax	
Broad-billed sandpiper	Calidris falcinellus	A
Sharp-tailed sandpiper	Calidris acuminata	A
Curlew sandpiper	Calidris ferruginea	A
Temminck's stint	Calidris temminckii	A
Sanderling	Calidris alba	A
Dunlin	Calidris alpina	A
Purple sandpiper	Calidris maritima	A
Baird's sandpiper	Calidris bairdii	A
Little stint	Calidris minuta	A
White-rumped sandpiper	Calidris fuscicollis	A
Least sandpiper	Calidris minutilla	A
Buff-breasted sandpiper	Calidris subruficollis	A
Pectoral sandpiper	Calidris melanotos	A
Semipalmated sandpiper	Calidris pusilla	A
Jack snipe	Lymnocryptes minimus	A
Eurasian woodcock	Scolopax rusticola	
Great snipe	Gallinago media	A
Common snipe	Gallinago gallinago	
Terek sandpiper	Xenus cinereus	A
Red-necked phalarope	Phalaropus lobatus	A
Red phalarope	Phalaropus fulicarius	A
Common sandpiper	Actitis hypoleucos	
Spotted sandpiper	Actitis macularius	A
Green sandpiper	Tringa ochropus	
Spotted redshank	Tringa erythropus	A
Common greenshank	Tringa nebularia	A
Lesser yellowlegs	Tringa flavipes	A
Marsh sandpiper	Tringa stagnatilis	
Wood sandpiper	Tringa glareola	A
Common redshank	Tringa totanus	

== Pratincoles and coursers ==
Order: Charadriiformes Family: Glareolidae

Glareolidae is a family of wading birds comprising the pratincoles, which have short legs, long pointed wings, and long forked tails, and the coursers, which have long legs, short wings, and long, pointed bills which curve downwards.

Common name	Binomial	Status
Cream-colored courser	Cursorius cursor	A
Collared pratincole	Glareola pratincola	A
Black-winged pratincole	Glareola nordmanni	A

== Skuas and jaegers ==
Order: Charadriiformes Family: Stercorariidae

The family Stercorariidae are, in general, medium to large sea birds, typically with gray or brown plumage, often with white markings on the wings. They nest on the ground in temperate and arctic regions and are long-distance migrants.

Common name	Binomial	Status
Great skua	Stercorarius skua	A
Pomarine jaeger	Stercorarius pomarinus	A
Parasitic jaeger	Stercorarius parasiticus	A
Long-tailed jaeger	Stercorarius longicaudus	A

== Auks, murres, and puffins ==
Order: Charadriiformes Family: Alcidae

Alcidae are a family of seabirds which are superficially similar to penguins with their black-and-white colors, their upright posture, and some of their habits, but which are able to fly.

Common name	Binomial	Status
Dovekie	Alle alle	A
Common murre	Uria aalge	A H
Thick-billed murre	Uria lomvia	A H
Razorbill	Alca torda	A
Atlantic puffin	Fratercula arctica	A

== Gulls, terns, and skimmers ==
Order: Charadriiformes Family: Laridae

Laridae is a family of medium to large seabirds and includes gulls, terns, and skimmers. Gulls are typically gray or white, often with black markings on the head or wings. They have stout, longish, bills and webbed feet. Terns are a group of generally medium to large seabirds typically with gray or white plumage, often with black markings on the head. Most terns hunt fish by diving but some pick insects off the surface of fresh water. Terns are generally long-lived birds, with several species known to live in excess of 30 years.

Common name	Binomial	Status
Black-legged kittiwake	Rissa tridactyla	A
Sabine's gull	Xema sabini	A
Slender-billed gull	Chroicocephalus genei	A
Black-headed gull	Chroicocephalus ridibundus	
Little gull	Hydrocoloeus minutus	
Franklin's gull	Leucophaeus pipixcan	A
Mediterranean gull	Ichthyaetus melanocephalus	
Pallas's gull	Ichthyaetus ichthyaetus	A
Audouin's gull	Ichthyaetus audouinii	A
Common gull	Larus canus	
Ring-billed gull	Larus delawarensis	A
Herring gull	Larus argentatus	A
Yellow-legged gull	Larus michahellis	
Caspian gull	Larus cachinnans	
Armenian gull	Larus armenicus	A
Iceland gull	Larus glaucoides	A H
Lesser black-backed gull	Larus fuscus	A
Glaucous gull	Larus hyperboreus	A
Great black-backed gull	Larus marinus	A
Little tern	Sternula albifrons	A
Gull-billed tern	Gelochelidon nilotica	
Caspian tern	Hydroprogne caspia	A
Black tern	Chlidonias niger	
White-winged tern	Chlidonias leucopterus	
Whiskered tern	Chlidonias hybrida	
Roseate tern	Sterna dougallii	A
Common tern	Sterna hirundo	
Arctic tern	Sterna paradisaea	A
Sandwich tern	Thalasseus sandvicensis	A
Lesser crested tern	Thalasseus bengalensis	A

== Loons ==
Order: Gaviiformes Family: Gaviidae

Loons are a group of aquatic birds found in many parts of North America and Northern Europe. They are the size of a large duck or small goose, which they somewhat resemble in shape when swimming, but to which they are completely unrelated. In particular, loons' legs are set very far back which assists swimming underwater but makes walking on land extremely difficult.

Common name	Binomial	Status
Red-throated loon	Gavia stellata	
Arctic loon	Gavia arctica	
Common loon	Gavia immer	A
Yellow-billed loon	Gavia adamsii	A

== Northern storm-petrels ==
Order: Procellariiformes Family: Hydrobatidae

The northern storm-petrels are relatives of the petrels and are the smallest seabirds. They feed on planktonic crustaceans and small fish picked from the surface, typically while hovering. The flight is fluttering and sometimes bat-like.

Common name	Binomial	Status
European storm-petrel	Hydrobates pelagicus	A
Leach's storm-petrel	Hydrobates leucorhous	A H

== Shearwaters and petrels ==
Order: Procellariiformes Family: Procellariidae

The procellariids are the main group of medium-sized "true petrels", characterized by united nostrils with medium septum and a long outer functional primary.

Common name	Binomial	Status
Cory's shearwater	Calonectris borealis	A H
Manx shearwater	Puffinus puffinus	A
Yelkouan shearwater	Puffinus yelkouan	A H

== Storks ==
Order: Ciconiiformes Family: Ciconiidae

Storks are large, long-legged, long-necked wading birds with long, stout bills. Storks are mute, but bill-clattering is an important mode of communication at the nest. Their nests can be large and may be reused for many years. Many species are migratory.

Common name	Binomial	Status
Black stork	Ciconia nigra	
White stork	Ciconia ciconia	

== Boobies and gannets ==
Order: Suliformes Family: Sulidae

The sulids comprise the gannets and boobies. Both groups are medium to large coastal seabirds that plunge-dive for fish.

Common name	Binomial	Status
Northern gannet	Morus bassanus	A H

== Cormorants and shags ==
Order: Suliformes Family: Phalacrocoracidae

Phalacrocoracidae is a family of medium-to-large fish-eating seabirds that includes cormorants and shags. Plumage coloration varies, with the majority having mainly dark plumage.

Common name	Binomial	Status
Pygmy cormorant	Microcarbo pygmeus	
Great cormorant	Phalacrocorax carbo	
European shag	Gulosus aristotelis	A

== Pelicans ==
Order: Pelecaniformes Family: Pelecanidae

Pelicans are very large water birds with a distinctive pouch under their beak. They have four webbed toes.

Common name	Binomial	Status
Great white pelican	Pelecanus onocrotalus	A
Dalmatian pelican	Pelecanus crispus	A

== Herons, egrets, and bitterns ==
Order: Pelecaniformes Family: Ardeidae

The family Ardeidae contains bitterns, herons, and egrets. Herons and egrets are medium to large wading birds with long necks and legs. Bitterns tend to be shorter necked and more wary. Members of Ardeidae fly with their necks retracted, unlike other long-necked birds such as storks, ibises, and spoonbills.

Common name	Binomial	Status
Great bittern	Botaurus stellaris	
Little bittern	Ixobrychus minutus	
Gray heron	Ardea cinerea	
Purple heron	Ardea purpurea	
Great egret	Egretta alba	
Little egret	Egretta garzetta	
Cattle egret	Bubulcus ibis	A
Squacco heron	Ardeola ralloides	A
Black-crowned night-heron	Nycticorax nycticorax	

== Ibises and spoonbills ==
Order: Pelecaniformes Family: Threskiornithidae

Threskiornithidae is a family of large terrestrial and wading birds which includes the ibises and spoonbills. They have long, broad wings with 11 primary and about 20 secondary feathers. They are strong fliers and, despite their size and weight, very capable soarers.

Common name	Binomial	Status
Glossy ibis	Plegadis falcinellus	A
Northern bald ibis	Geronticus eremita	I
Eurasian spoonbill	Platalea leucorodia	

== Osprey ==
Order: Accipitriformes Family: Pandionidae

The family Pandionidae contains only one species, the osprey. The osprey is a medium-large raptor which is a specialist fish-eater with a worldwide distribution.

Common name	Binomial	Status
Osprey	Pandion haliaetus	

== Hawks, eagles, and kites ==
Order: Accipitriformes Family: Accipitridae

Accipitridae is a family of birds of prey which includes hawks, eagles, kites, harriers, and Old World vultures. They have powerful hooked beaks for tearing flesh from their prey, strong legs, powerful talons, and keen eyesight.

Common name	Binomial	Status
Black-winged kite	Elanus caeruleus	A
Bearded vulture	Gypaetus barbatus	
Egyptian vulture	Neophron percnopterus	A
European honey-buzzard	Pernis apivorus	
Cinereous vulture	Aegypius monachus	
Eurasian griffon	Gyps fulvus	
Short-toed snake-eagle	Circaetus gallicus	A
Lesser spotted eagle	Clanga pomarina	A
Greater spotted eagle	Clanga clanga	A
Booted eagle	Hieraaetus pennatus	
Steppe eagle	Aquila nipalensis	A
Imperial eagle	Aquila heliaca	
Golden eagle	Aquila chrysaetos	
Bonelli's eagle	Aquila fasciata	A
Eurasian marsh-harrier	Circus aeruginosus	
Hen harrier	Circus cyaneus	
Pallid harrier	Circus macrourus	A
Montagu's harrier	Circus pygargus	
Levant sparrowhawk	Accipiter brevipes	A
Eurasian sparrowhawk	Accipiter nisus	
Northern goshawk	Accipiter gentilis	
Red kite	Milvus milvus	
Black kite	Milvus migrans	
White-tailed eagle	Haliaeetus albicilla	
Rough-legged hawk	Buteo lagopus	
Common buzzard	Buteo buteo	
Long-legged buzzard	Buteo rufinus	A

== Barn-owls ==
Order: Strigiformes Family: Tytonidae

Barn-owls are medium to large owls with large heads and characteristic heart-shaped faces. They have long strong legs with powerful talons.

Common name	Binomial	Status
Western barn owl	Tyto alba	

== Owls ==
Order: Strigiformes Family: Strigidae

Typical owls are small to large solitary nocturnal birds of prey. They have large forward-facing eyes and ears, a hawk-like beak, and a conspicuous circle of feathers around each eye called a facial disc.

Common name	Binomial	Status
Eurasian scops-owl	Otus scops	
Eurasian eagle-owl	Bubo bubo	
Snowy owl	Bubo scandiacus	A
Northern hawk owl	Surnia ulula	A
Eurasian pygmy-owl	Glaucidium passerinum	
Little owl	Athene noctua	
Tawny owl	Strix aluco	
Ural owl	Strix uralensis	
Long-eared owl	Asio otus	
Short-eared owl	Asio flammeus	
Boreal owl	Aegolius funereus	

== Hoopoes ==
Order: Bucerotiformes Family: Upupidae

Hoopoes have black, white, and orangey-pink coloring with a large erectile crest on their head.

Common name	Binomial	Status
Eurasian hoopoe	Upupa epops	

== Kingfishers ==
Order: Coraciiformes Family: Alcedinidae

Kingfishers are medium-sized birds with large heads, long pointed bills, short legs, and stubby tails.

Common name	Binomial	Status
Common kingfisher	Alcedo atthis	

== Bee-eaters ==
Order: Coraciiformes Family: Meropidae

The bee-eaters are a group of near-passerine birds. Most species are found in Africa but others occur in southern Europe, Madagascar, Australia, and New Guinea. They are characterized by richly colored plumage, slender bodies, and usually elongated central tail feathers. All are colorful and have long downturned bills and pointed wings, which give them a swallow-like appearance when seen from afar.

Common name	Binomial	Status
Blue-cheeked bee-eater	Merops persicus	A
European bee-eater	Merops apiaster	

== Rollers ==
Order: Coraciiformes Family: Coraciidae

Rollers resemble crows in size and build, but are more closely related to the kingfishers and bee-eaters. They share the colorful appearance of those groups with blues and browns predominating. The two inner front toes are connected, but the outer toe is not.

Common name	Binomial	Status
European roller	Coracias garrulus	

== Woodpeckers ==
Order: Piciformes Family: Picidae

Woodpeckers are small to medium-sized birds with chisel-like beaks, short legs, stiff tails, and long tongues used for capturing insects. Some species have feet with two toes pointing forward and two backward, while several species have only three toes. Many woodpeckers have the habit of tapping noisily on tree trunks with their beaks.

Common name	Binomial	Status
Eurasian wryneck	Jynx torquilla	
Eurasian three-toed woodpecker	Picoides tridactylus	
Middle spotted woodpecker	Dendrocoptes medius	
White-backed woodpecker	Dendrocopos leucotos	
Great spotted woodpecker	Dendrocopos major	
Syrian woodpecker	Dendrocopos syriacus	
Lesser spotted woodpecker	Dryobates minor	
Gray-headed woodpecker	Picus canus	
Eurasian green woodpecker	Picus viridis	
Black woodpecker	Dryocopus martius	

== Falcons and caracaras ==
Order: Falconiformes Family: Falconidae

Falconidae is a family of diurnal birds of prey. They differ from hawks, eagles, and kites in that they kill with their beaks instead of their talons.

Common name	Binomial	Status
Lesser kestrel	Falco naumanni	A (considered extirpated by IUCN Red List)
Eurasian kestrel	Falco tinnunculus	
Red-footed falcon	Falco vespertinus	
Eleonora's falcon	Falco eleonorae	A
Merlin	Falco columbarius	
Eurasian hobby	Falco subbuteo	
Saker falcon	Falco cherrug	
Gyrfalcon	Falco rusticolus	A
Peregrine falcon	Falco peregrinus	

== Old World orioles ==
Order: Passeriformes Family: Oriolidae

The Old World orioles are colorful passerine birds that are not related to the New World orioles.

Common name	Binomial	Status
Eurasian golden oriole	Oriolus oriolus	

== Shrikes ==
Order: Passeriformes Family: Laniidae

Shrikes are passerine birds known for their habit of catching other birds and small animals and impaling the uneaten portions of their bodies on thorns. A shrike's beak is hooked, like that of a typical bird of prey.

Common name	Binomial	Status
Red-backed shrike	Lanius collurio	
Isabelline shrike	Lanius isabellinus	A
Great gray shrike	Lanius excubitor	
Lesser gray shrike	Lanius minor	A
Woodchat shrike	Lanius senator	A

== Crows, jays, and magpies ==
Order: Passeriformes Family: Corvidae

The family Corvidae includes crows, ravens, jays, choughs, magpies, treepies, nutcrackers, and ground jays. Corvids are larger than the average size for species in the order Passeriformes and some show high levels of intelligence.

Common name	Binomial	Status
Eurasian jay	Garrulus glandarius	
Eurasian magpie	Pica pica	
Eurasian nutcracker	Nucifraga caryocatactes	
Red-billed chough	Pyrrhocorax pyrrhocorax	A
Yellow-billed chough	Pyrrhocorax graculus	
Eurasian jackdaw	Corvus monedula	
Rook	Corvus frugilegus	
Carrion crow	Corvus corone	
Hooded crow	Corvus cornix	
Common raven	Corvus corax	

== Tits, chickadees, and titmice ==
Order: Passeriformes Family: Paridae

The Paridae are mainly small stocky woodland species with short stout bills. Some have crests. They are adaptable birds, with a mixed diet including seeds and insects.

Common name	Binomial	Status
Coal tit	Periparus ater	
Crested tit	Lophophanes cristatus	
Marsh tit	Poecile palustris	
Willow tit	Poecile montanus	
Eurasian blue tit	Cyanistes caeruleus	
Azure tit	Cyanistes cyanus	A
Great tit	Parus major	

== Penduline-tits ==
Order: Passeriformes Family: Remizidae

The penduline-tits are a group of small insectivorous birds related to the true tits.

Common name	Binomial	Status
Eurasian penduline-tit	Remiz pendulinus	

== Larks ==
Order: Passeriformes Family: Alaudidae

Larks are small terrestrial birds with often extravagant songs and display flights. Most larks are dull in appearance. Their food is insects and seeds.

Common name	Binomial	Status
Horned lark	Eremophila alpestris	A
Greater short-toed lark	Calandrella brachydactyla	
Bimaculated lark	Melanocorypha bimaculata	A
Calandra lark	Melanocorypha calandra	A
Black lark	Melanocorypha yeltoniensis	A H
Mediterranean short-toed lark	Alaudala rufescens	A
Turkestan short-toed lark	Alaudala heinei	A
Wood lark	Lullula arborea	
White-winged lark	Alauda leucoptera	A H
Eurasian skylark	Alauda arvensis	
Crested lark	Galerida cristata	

== Bearded reedling ==
Order: Passeriformes Family: Panuridae

This species, the only one in its family, is found in reed beds throughout temperate Europe and Asia.

Common name	Binomial	Status
Bearded reedling	Panurus biarmicus	

== Cisticolas and allies ==
Order: Passeriformes Family: Cisticolidae

The Cisticolidae are warblers found mainly in warmer southern regions of the Old World. They are generally very small birds of drab brown or gray appearance found in open country such as grassland or scrub.

Common name	Binomial	Status
Zitting cisticola	Cisticola juncidis	A

== Reed warblers and allies ==
Order: Passeriformes Family: Acrocephalidae

The members of this family are usually rather large for "warblers". Most are rather plain olivaceous brown above with much yellow to beige below. They are usually found in open woodland, reedbeds, or tall grass. The family occurs mostly in southern to western Eurasia and surroundings, but it also ranges far into the Pacific, with some species in Africa.

Common name	Binomial	Status
Booted warbler	Iduna caligata	A
Eastern olivaceous warbler	Iduna pallida	A
Melodious warbler	Hippolais polyglotta	
Icterine warbler	Hippolais icterina	
Aquatic warbler	Acrocephalus paludicola	A
Moustached warbler	Acrocephalus melanopogon	
Sedge warbler	Acrocephalus schoenobaenus	
Paddyfield warbler	Acrocephalus agricola	A
Blyth's reed warbler	Acrocephalus dumetorum	A
Marsh warbler	Acrocephalus palustris	
Eurasian reed warbler	Acrocephalus scirpaceus	
Great reed warbler	Acrocephalus arundinaceus	

== Grassbirds and allies ==
Order: Passeriformes Family: Locustellidae

Locustellidae are a family of small insectivorous songbirds found mainly in Eurasia, Africa, and the Australian region. They are smallish birds with tails that are usually long and pointed, and tend to be drab brownish or buffy all over.

Common name	Binomial	Status
River warbler	Locustella fluviatilis	
Savi's warbler	Locustella luscinioides	
Common grasshopper-warbler	Locustella naevia	

== Swallows ==
Order: Passeriformes Family: Hirundinidae

The family Hirundinidae is adapted to aerial feeding. They have a slender streamlined body, long pointed wings, and a short bill with a wide gape. The feet are adapted to perching rather than walking, and the front toes are partially joined at the base.

Common name	Binomial	Status
Bank swallow	Riparia riparia	
Eurasian crag-martin	Ptyonoprogne rupestris	
Barn swallow	Hirundo rustica	
Red-rumped swallow	Hirundo daurica	A
Common house-martin	Delichon urbicum	

== Leaf warblers ==
Order: Passeriformes Family: Phylloscopidae

Leaf warblers are a family of small insectivorous birds found mostly in Eurasia and ranging into Wallacea and Africa. The species are of various sizes, often green-plumaged above and yellow below, or more subdued with grayish-green to grayish-brown colors.

Common name	Binomial	Status
Wood warbler	Phylloscopus sibilatrix	
Western Bonelli's warbler	Phylloscopus bonelli	
Yellow-browed warbler	Phylloscopus inornatus	A
Hume's warbler	Phylloscopus humei	A
Pallas's leaf warbler	Phylloscopus proregulus	A
Dusky warbler	Phylloscopus fuscatus	A
Plain leaf warbler	Phylloscopus neglectus	A
Willow warbler	Phylloscopus trochilus	
Common chiffchaff	Phylloscopus collybita	
Greenish warbler	Phylloscopus trochiloides	A
Arctic warbler	Phylloscopus borealis	A

== Bush warblers and allies ==
Order: Passeriformes Family: Scotocercidae

The members of this family are found throughout Africa, Asia, and Polynesia. Their taxonomy is in flux, and some authorities place some genera in other families.

Common name	Binomial	Status
Cetti's warbler	Cettia cetti	

== Long-tailed tits ==
Order: Passeriformes Family: Aegithalidae

Long-tailed tits are a group of small passerine birds with medium to long tails. They make woven bag nests in trees. Most eat a mixed diet which includes insects.

Common name	Binomial	Status
Long-tailed tit	Aegithalos caudatus	

== Sylviid warblers, parrotbills, and allies ==
Order: Passeriformes Family: Sylviidae

The family Sylviidae is a group of small insectivorous birds. They mainly occur as breeding species, as another common name (Old World warblers) implies, in Europe, Asia and, to a lesser extent, Africa. Most are of generally undistinguished appearance, but many have distinctive songs.

Common name	Binomial	Status
Eurasian blackcap	Sylvia atricapilla	
Garden warbler	Sylvia borin	
Barred warbler	Curruca nisoria	
Lesser whitethroat	Curruca curruca	
Western Orphean warbler	Curruca hortensis	A
Asian desert warbler	Curruca nana	A
Sardinian warbler	Curruca melanocephala	A
Eastern subalpine warbler	Curruca cantillans	A
Greater whitethroat	Curruca communis	
Spectacled warbler	Curruca conspicillata	A

== Kinglets ==
Order: Passeriformes Family: Regulidae

The kinglets and "crests" are a small family of birds which resemble some warblers. They are very small insectivorous birds in the single genus Regulus. The adults have colored crowns, giving rise to their name.

Common name	Binomial	Status
Goldcrest	Regulus regulus	
Common firecrest	Regulus ignicapilla	

== Wallcreeper ==
Order: Passeriformes Family: Tichodromidae

The wallcreeper is a small bird related to the nuthatch family, which has stunning crimson, gray, and black plumage. It is the only species in its family

Common name	Binomial	Status
Wallcreeper	Tichodroma muraria	

== Nuthatches ==
Order: Passeriformes Family: Sittidae

Nuthatches are small woodland birds. They have the unusual ability to climb down trees head first, unlike other birds which can only go upwards. Nuthatches have big heads, short tails, and powerful bills and feet.

Common name	Binomial	Status
Eurasian nuthatch	Sitta europaea	

== Treecreepers ==
Order: Passeriformes Family: Certhiidae

Treecreepers are small woodland birds, brown above and white below. They have thin pointed down-curved bills, which they use to extricate insects from bark. They have stiff tail feathers, like woodpeckers, which they use to support themselves on vertical trees.

Common name	Binomial	Status
Eurasian treecreeper	Certhia familiaris	
Short-toed treecreeper	Certhia brachydactyla	

== Wrens ==
Order: Passeriformes Family: Troglodytidae

The wrens are mainly small and inconspicuous except for their loud songs. These birds have short wings and thin down-turned bills. Several species often hold their tails upright. All are insectivorous.

Common name	Binomial	Status
Eurasian wren	Troglodytes troglodytes	

== Dippers ==
Order: Passeriformes Family: Cinclidae

Dippers are a group of perching birds whose habitat includes aquatic environments in the Americas, Europe, and Asia. They are named for their bobbing or dipping movements.

Common name	Binomial	Status
White-throated dipper	Cinclus cinclus	

== Starlings ==
Order: Passeriformes Family: Sturnidae

Starlings are small to medium-sized passerine birds. Their flight is strong and direct and they are very gregarious. Their preferred habitat is fairly open country. They eat insects and fruit. Their plumage is typically dark with a metallic sheen.

Common name	Binomial	Status
European starling	Sturnus vulgaris	
Rosy starling	Pastor roseus	(A)

== Thrushes and allies ==
Order: Passeriformes Family: Turdidae

The thrushes are a family of birds that occur mainly in the Old World. They are plump, soft-plumaged, small-to-medium-sized insectivores or sometimes omnivores, often feeding on the ground. Many have attractive songs.

Common name	Binomial	Status
White's thrush	Zoothera aurea	A H
Scaly thrush	Zoothera dauma	A
Mistle thrush	Turdus viscivorus	
Song thrush	Turdus philomelos	
Redwing	Turdus iliacus	
Eurasian blackbird	Turdus merula	
American robin	Turdus migratorius	A H
Fieldfare	Turdus pilaris	
Ring ouzel	Turdus torquatus	
Black-throated thrush	Turdus atrogularis	A
Dusky thrush	Turdus eunomus	A
Naumann's thrush	Turdus naumanni	A

== Old World flycatchers ==
Order: Passeriformes Family: Muscicapidae

Old World flycatchers are a large group of birds which are mainly small arboreal insectivores. The appearance of these birds is highly varied, but they mostly have weak songs and harsh calls.

Common name	Binomial	Status
Spotted flycatcher	Muscicapa striata	
European robin	Erithacus rubecula	
Thrush nightingale	Luscinia luscinia	
Common nightingale	Luscinia megarhynchos	
Bluethroat	Luscinia svecica	
Siberian rubythroat	Calliope calliope	A
Red-breasted flycatcher	Ficedula parva	
Semicollared flycatcher	Ficedula semitorquata	A
European pied flycatcher	Ficedula hypoleuca	
Collared flycatcher	Ficedula albicollis	
Common redstart	Phoenicurus phoenicurus	
Black redstart	Phoenicurus ochruros	
Rufous-tailed rock-thrush	Monticola saxatilis	
Blue rock-thrush	Monticola solitarius	A
Whinchat	Saxicola rubetra	
European stonechat	Saxicola torquatus	
Siberian stonechat	Saxicola maurus	A
Northern wheatear	Oenanthe oenanthe	
Isabelline wheatear	Oenanthe isabellina	A
Desert wheatear	Oenanthe deserti	A
Western black-eared wheatear	Oenanthe hispanica	A
Pied wheatear	Oenanthe pleschanka	A

== Waxwings ==
Order: Passeriformes Family: Bombycillidae

The waxwings are a group of birds with soft silky plumage and unique red tips to some of the wing feathers. In the Bohemian and cedar waxwings, these tips look like sealing wax and give the group its name. These are arboreal birds of northern forests. They live on insects in summer and berries in winter.

Common name	Binomial	Status
Bohemian waxwing	Bombycilla garrulus	

== Accentors ==
Order: Passeriformes Family: Prunellidae

The accentors are the only bird family which is endemic to the Palearctic. They are small, fairly drab species superficially similar to sparrows.

Common name	Binomial	Status
Alpine accentor	Prunella collaris	
Siberian accentor	Prunella montanella	A H
Dunnock	Prunella modularis	

== Old World sparrows ==
Order: Passeriformes Family: Passeridae

In general, Old World sparrows tend to be small, plump, brown or gray birds with short tails and short powerful beaks. Sparrows are seed eaters, but they also consume small insects.

Common name	Binomial	Status
House sparrow	Passer domesticus	
Italian sparrow	Passer italiae	
Eurasian tree sparrow	Passer montanus	
Rock sparrow	Petronia petronia	A H
White-winged snowfinch	Montifringilla nivalis	

== Wagtails and pipits ==
Order: Passeriformes Family: Motacillidae

Motacillidae is a family of small birds with medium to long tails which includes the wagtails, longclaws, and pipits. They are slender ground-feeding insectivores of open country.

Common name	Binomial	Status
Gray wagtail	Motacilla cinerea	
Western yellow wagtail	Motacilla flava	
Citrine wagtail	Motacilla citreola	A
White wagtail	Motacilla alba	
Richard's pipit	Anthus richardi	A
Tawny pipit	Anthus campestris	
Meadow pipit	Anthus pratensis	
Tree pipit	Anthus trivialis	
Olive-backed pipit	Anthus hodgsoni	A
Red-throated pipit	Anthus cervinus	A
Water pipit	Anthus spinoletta	
Rock pipit	Anthus petrosus	A

== Finches, euphonias, and allies ==
Order: Passeriformes Family: Fringillidae

Finches are seed-eating birds that are small to moderately large and have a strong beak, usually conical and in some species very large. All have twelve tail feathers and nine primaries. These birds have a bouncing flight with alternating bouts of flapping and gliding on closed wings, and most sing well.

Common name	Binomial	Status
Common chaffinch	Fringilla coelebs	
Brambling	Fringilla montifringilla	
Hawfinch	Coccothraustes coccothraustes	
Common rosefinch	Carpodacus erythrinus	
Pine grosbeak	Pinicola enucleator	A H
Eurasian bullfinch	Pyrrhula pyrrhula	
Trumpeter finch	Bucanetes githagineus	A
European greenfinch	Chloris chloris	
Twite	Linaria flavirostris	
Eurasian linnet	Linaria cannabina	
Common redpoll	Acanthis flammea	
Lesser redpoll	Acanthis cabaret	
Hoary redpoll	Acanthis hornemanni	A
Parrot crossbill	Loxia pytyopsittacus	A
Red crossbill	Loxia curvirostra	
White-winged crossbill	Loxia leucoptera	A
European goldfinch	Carduelis carduelis	
Citril finch	Serinus citrinella	
European serin	Serinus serinus	
Eurasian siskin	Spinus spinus	

== Longspurs and snow buntings ==
Order: Passeriformes Family: Calcariidae

The Calcariidae are a family of birds that had been traditionally grouped with the New World sparrows, but differ in a number of respects and are usually found in open grassy areas.

Common name	Binomial	Status
Lapland longspur	Calcarius lapponicus	A
Snow bunting	Plectrophenax nivalis	

== Old World buntings ==
Order: Passeriformes Family: Emberizidae

Emberizidae is a family of passerine birds containing a single genus. Until 2017, the New World sparrows (Passerellidae) were also considered part of this family.

Common name	Binomial	Status
Black-headed bunting	Emberiza melanocephala	A
Corn bunting	Emberiza calandra	
Rock bunting	Emberiza cia	
Cirl bunting	Emberiza cirlus	A
Yellowhammer	Emberiza citrinella	
Pine bunting	Emberiza leucocephalos	A
Ortolan bunting	Emberiza hortulana	
Cretzschmar's bunting	Emberiza caesia	A
Pallas's bunting	Emberiza pallasi	A
Reed bunting	Emberiza schoeniclus	
Little bunting	Emberiza pusilla	A
Rustic bunting	Emberiza rustica	A

== See also ==
- List of birds
- Lists of birds by region
