= Starch =

Glucose polymer used as energy store in plants

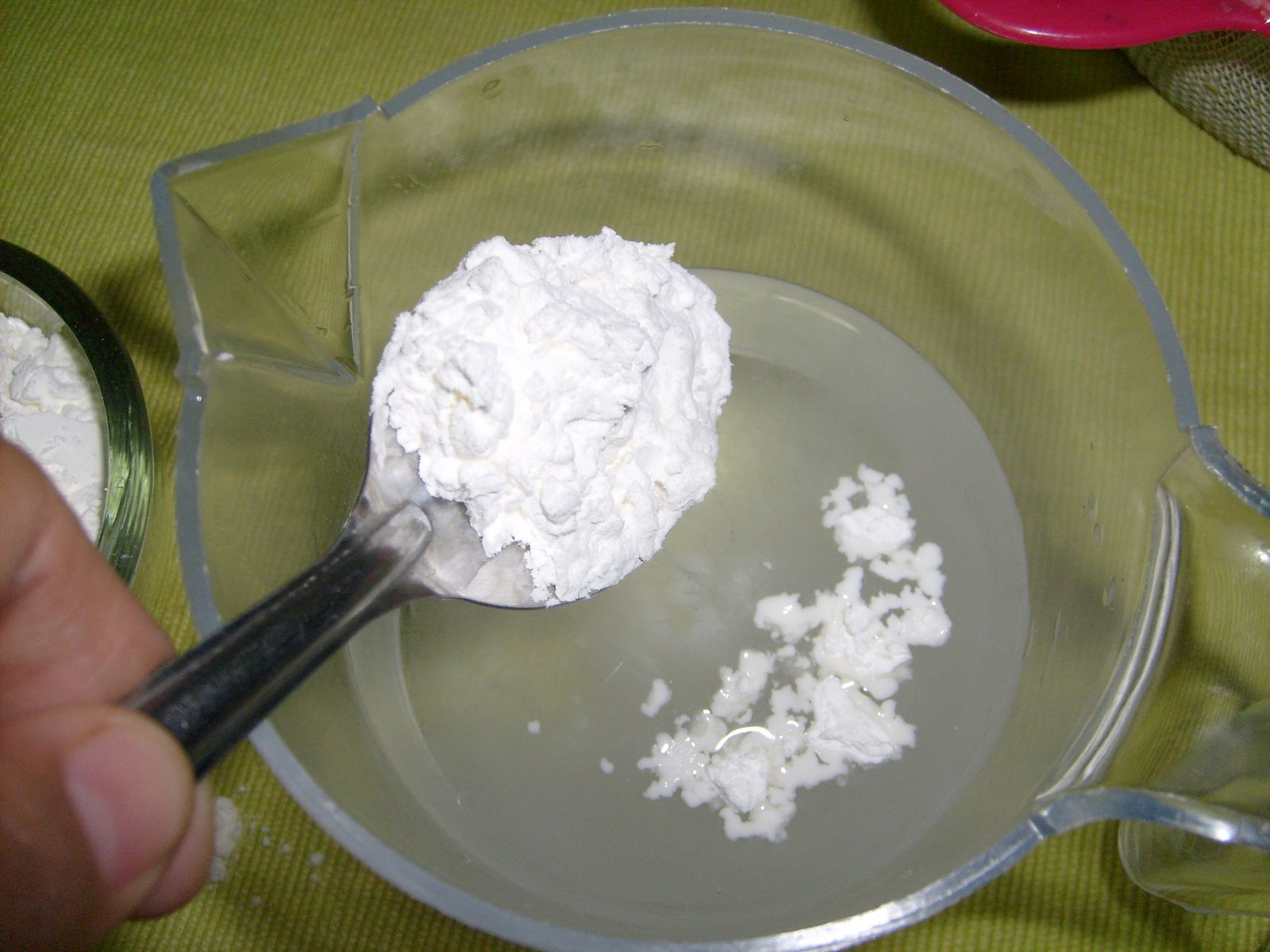
- Cornstarch being mixed with water

Identifiers
CAS Number	9005-25-8
ChemSpider	none
ECHA InfoCard	100.029.696
EC Number	232-679-6
RTECS number	GM5090000
UNII	24SC3U704I
CompTox Dashboard (EPA)	DTXSID0049789

Properties
Chemical formula	(C_{6}H_{10}O_{5})_{n}
Molar mass	Variable
Appearance	White powder
Density	Variable
Melting point	decomposes
Solubility in water	insoluble (see starch gelatinization)

Thermochemistry
Std enthalpy of combustion (Δ_{c}H^{⦵}_{298})	4.1788 kilocalories per gram (17.484 kJ/g) (Higher heating value)

Hazards
Autoignition temperature	410 °C (770 °F; 683 K)
- NIOSH (US health exposure limits)
PEL (Permissible)	TWA 15 mg/m^{3} (total) TWA 5 mg/m^{3} (resp)
Safety data sheet (SDS)	ICSC 1553
- Except where otherwise noted, data are given for materials in their standard state (at 25 °C [77 °F], 100 kPa). verify (what is ?) Infobox references

Structure of the amylose molecule

Structure of the amylopectin molecule

Starch is a carbohydrate consisting of numerous glucose units joined by glycosidic bonds. This polysaccharide is produced by most green plants for energy storage. Worldwide, it is the most common carbohydrate in human diets, and is contained in large amounts in staple foods such as wheat, potatoes, maize (corn), rice, and cassava (manioc).

Starch is a white, tasteless and odorless powder that is insoluble in cold water or alcohol. It consists of two types of molecules: the linear and helical amylose and the branched amylopectin. Depending on the plant, starch generally contains 20–25% amylose and 75–80% amylopectin by weight. Glycogen, the energy reserve of animals, is a more highly branched version of amylopectin.

In industry, starch is often converted into sugars, for example by malting. These sugars may be fermented to produce ethanol in the manufacture of beer, whisky and biofuel. In addition, sugars produced from processed starch are used in many processed foods.

Mixing most starches in warm water produces a paste, such as wheatpaste, which can be used as a thickening, stiffening or gluing agent. The principal non-food, industrial use of starch is as an adhesive in the papermaking process. A similar paste, clothing or laundry starch, can be applied to certain textile goods before ironing to stiffen them.

== Etymology ==
The word starch is from a Germanic root with the meanings "strong, stiff, strengthen, stiffen".

Modern German Stärke (strength, starch) is related and refers to the main historical applications, its uses in textiles: sizing yarn for weaving, and starching linen.

The Greek term for starch, amylon (ἄμυλον), which means "not milled", is also related. It provides the root amyl, which is used as a prefix for several carbon compounds related to or derived from starch (e.g. amyl alcohol, amylose, amylopectin).

== History ==
Starch grains from the rhizomes of Typha (cattails, bullrushes) as flour have been identified from grinding stones in Europe dating back to 30,000 years ago. Starch grains from sorghum were found on grind stones in caves in Ngalue, Mozambique dating up to 100,000 years ago.

Pure extracted wheat starch paste was used in Ancient Egypt, possibly to glue papyrus. The extraction of starch is first described in the Natural History of Pliny the Elder around 77–79 CE. Romans used it also in cosmetic creams, to powder the hair and to thicken sauces. Persians and Indians used it to make dishes similar to gothumai wheat halva. Rice starch as surface treatment of paper has been used in paper production in China since 700 CE. In the mid eighth century production of paper that was sized with wheat starch started in the Arabic world. Laundry starch was first described in England in the beginning of the 15th century and was essential to make 16th century ruffed collars.

== Energy store of plants ==
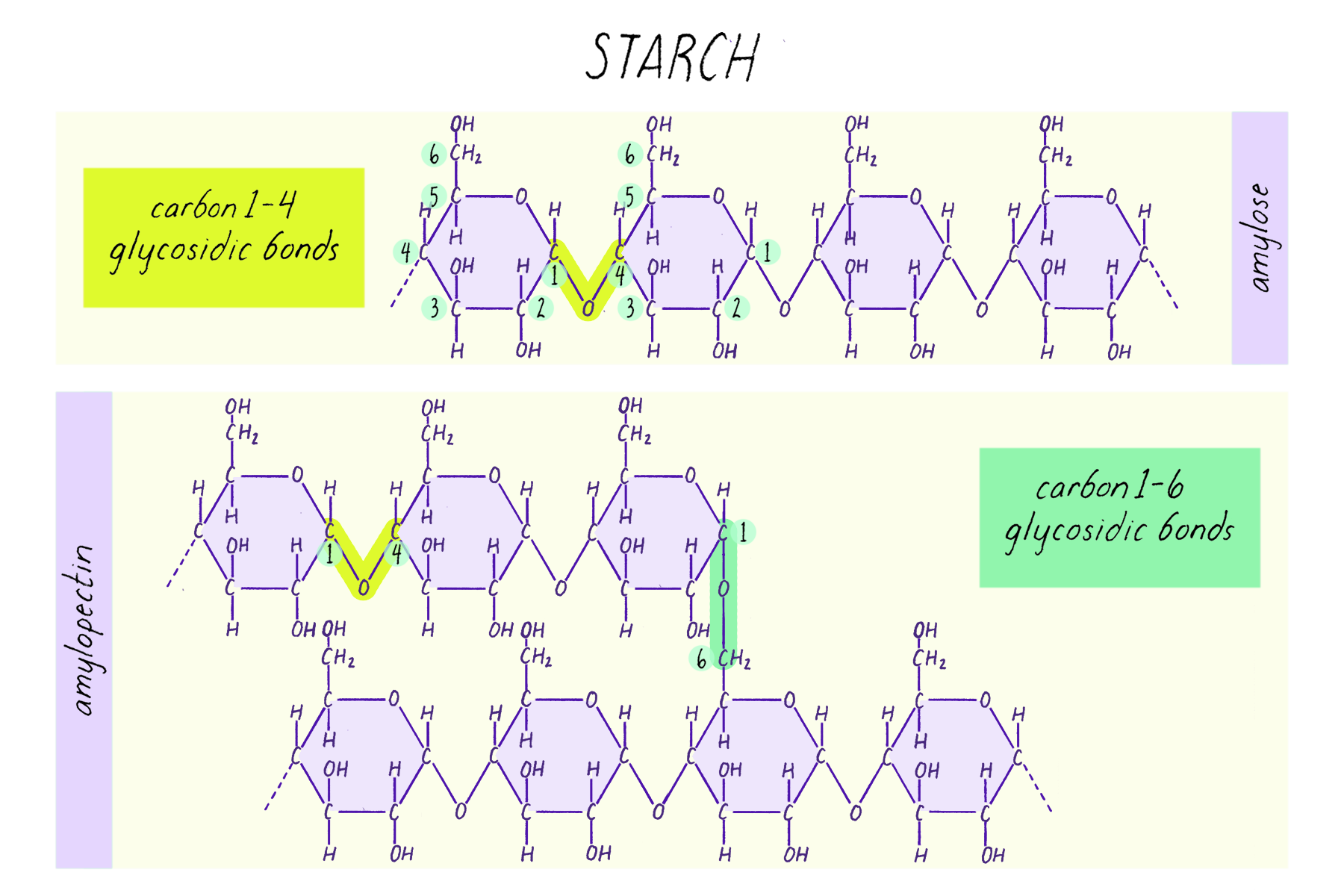
Starch is composed of glucose monomers linked by α-1,4-glycosidic bonds sometimes with α-1,6 branches is used for energy storage in plants

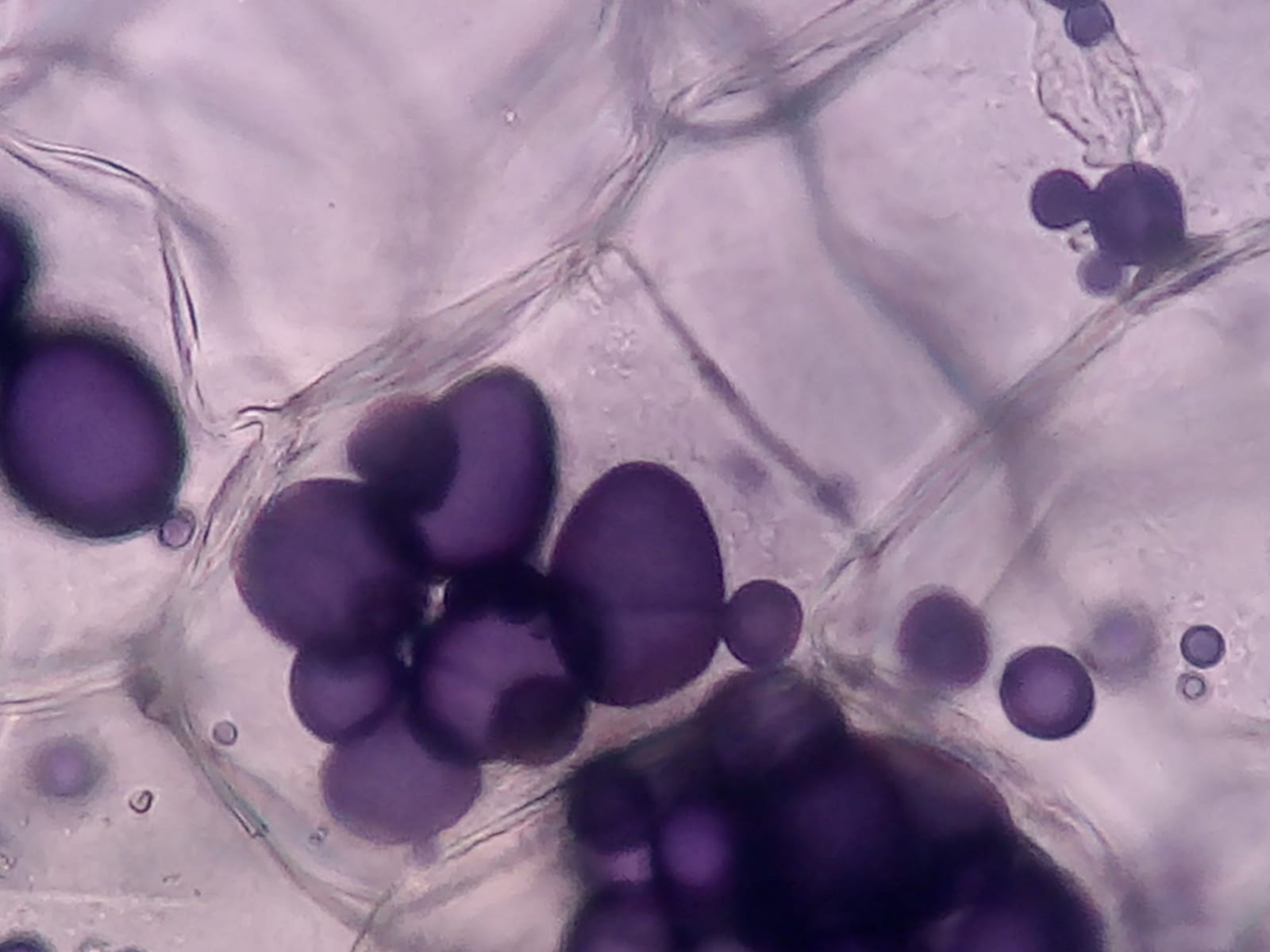
Potato starch granules in cells of the potato

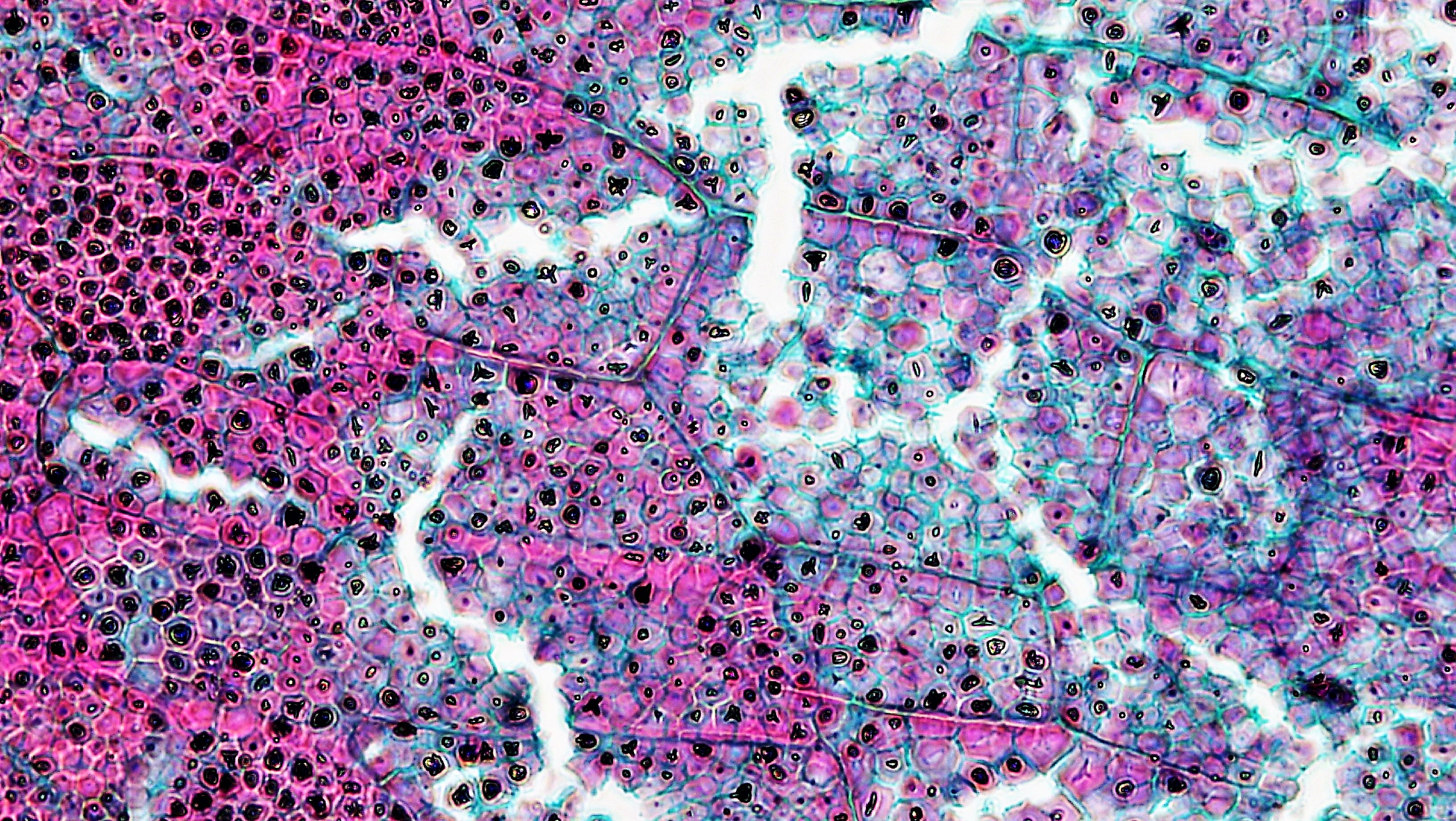
Starch in endosperm in embryonic phase of maize seed

Plants produce glucose from carbon dioxide and water by photosynthesis. The glucose is used to generate the chemical energy required for general metabolism as well as a precursor to myriad organic building blocks such as nucleic acids, lipids, proteins, and structural polysaccharides such as cellulose. Most green plants store any extra glucose in the form of starch, which is packed into semicrystalline granules called starch granules or amyloplasts. Toward the end of the growing season, starch accumulates in twigs of trees near the buds. Fruit, seeds, rhizomes, and tubers store starch to prepare for the next growing season. Young plants live on this stored energy in their roots, seeds, and fruits until they can find suitable soil in which to grow. The starch is also consumed at night when photosynthesis is not occurring.

Green algae and land-plants store their starch in the plastids, whereas red algae, glaucophytes, cryptomonads, dinoflagellates and the parasitic apicomplexa store a similar type of polysaccharide called floridean starch in their cytosol or periplast.

Especially when hydrated, glucose takes up much space and is osmotically active. Starch, on the other hand, being insoluble and therefore osmotically inactive, can be stored much more compactly. The semicrystalline granules generally consist of concentric layers of amylose and amylopectin which can be made bioavailable upon cellular demand in the plant.

Amylose consists of long chains derived from glucose molecules connected by α-1,4-glycosidic linkage. Amylopectin is highly branched but derived from glucose. Amylopectin's main chain is α‑1,4-linked, same as amylose — the α‑1,6 bonds occur only at branch points. The same type of linkage is found in the animal reserve polysaccharide glycogen. By contrast, many structural polysaccharides such as chitin, cellulose, and peptidoglycan are linked by β-glycosidic bonds, which are more resistant to hydrolysis.

=== Structure of starch particles ===
Within plants, starch is stored in semi-crystalline granules. Each plant species has a distinctive starch granular size: rice starch is relatively small (about 2 μm), potato starches have larger granules (up to 100 μm) while wheat and tapioca fall in-between. Unlike other botanical sources of starch, wheat starch has a bimodal size distribution, with both smaller and larger granules ranging from 2 to 55 μm.

Some cultivated plant varieties have pure amylopectin starch without amylose, known as waxy starches. The most used is waxy maize, others are glutinous rice and waxy potato starch. Waxy starches undergo less retrogradation, resulting in a more stable paste. A maize cultivar with a relatively high proportion of amylose starch, amylomaize, is cultivated for the use of its gel strength and for use as a resistant starch (a starch that resists digestion) in food products.

=== Biosynthesis ===
Plants synthesize starch in two types of tissues. The first type is storage tissues, for example, cereal endosperm, and storage roots and stems such as cassava and potato. The second type is green tissue, for example, leaves, where many plant species synthesize transitory starch on a daily basis. In both tissue types, starch is synthesized in plastids (amyloplasts and chloroplasts).

The biochemical pathway involves conversion of glucose 1-phosphate to ADP-glucose using the enzyme glucose-1-phosphate adenylyltransferase. This step requires energy in the form of ATP. A number of starch synthases available in plastids then add the ADP-glucose via α-1,4-glycosidic bonds to a growing chain of glucose residues, liberating ADP. The ADP-glucose is almost certainly added to the non-reducing end of the amylose polymer, as the UDP-glucose is added to the non-reducing end of glycogen during glycogen synthesis. The small glucan chains further agglomerate to form initials of starch granules.

The biosynthesis and expansion of granules represent a complex molecular event that can be subdivided into four major steps, namely, granule initiation, coalescence of small granules, phase transition, and expansion. Several proteins have been characterized for their involvement in each of these processes. For instance, a chloroplast membrane-associated protein, MFP1, determines the sites of granule initiation. Another protein named PTST2 binds to small glucan chains and agglomerates to recruit starch synthase 4 (SS4). Three other proteins, namely, PTST3, SS5, and MRC, are also known to be involved in the process of starch granule initiation. Furthermore, two proteins named ESV and LESV play a role in the aqueous-to-crystalline phase transition of glucan chains. Several catalytically active starch synthases, such as SS1, SS2, SS3, and GBSS, are critical for starch granule biosynthesis and play a catalytic role at each step of granule biogenesis and expansion.

In addition to above proteins, starch branching enzymes (BEs) introduces α-1,6-glycosidic bonds between the glucose chains, creating the branched amylopectin. The starch debranching enzyme (DBE) isoamylase removes some of these branches. Several isoforms of these enzymes exist, leading to a highly complex synthesis process.

=== Degradation ===
The starch that is synthesized in plant leaves during the day is transitory: it serves as an energy source at night. Enzymes catalyze release of glucose from the granules. The insoluble, highly branched starch chains require phosphorylation in order to be accessible for degrading enzymes. The enzyme glucan, water dikinase installs a phosphate at the C-6 position of glucose, close to the chain's 1,6-alpha branching bonds. A second enzyme, phosphoglucan, water dikinase phosphorylates the glucose molecule at the C-3 position. After the second phosphorylation, the first degrading enzyme, beta-amylase (BAM) attacks the glucose chain at its non-reducing end. Maltose is the main product released. If the glucose chain consists of three or fewer molecules, BAM cannot release maltose. A second enzyme, disproportionating enzyme-1, combines two maltotriose molecules. From this chain, a glucose molecule is released. Now, BAM can release another maltose molecule from the remaining chain. This cycle repeats until starch is fully degraded. If BAM comes close to the phosphorylated branching point of the glucose chain, it can no longer release maltose. In order for the phosphorylated chain to be degraded, the enzyme isoamylase is required.

The products of starch degradation are predominantly maltose and smaller amounts of glucose. These molecules are exported from the plastid to the cytosol, maltose via the maltose transporter and glucose by the plastidic glucose translocator. These two sugars are used for sucrose synthesis. Sucrose can then be used in the oxidative pentose phosphate pathway in the mitochondria, to generate ATP at night.

== Starch industry ==
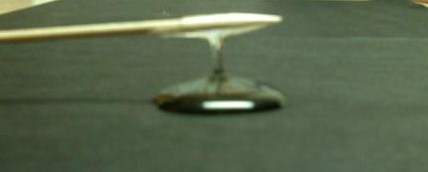
Glucose syrup

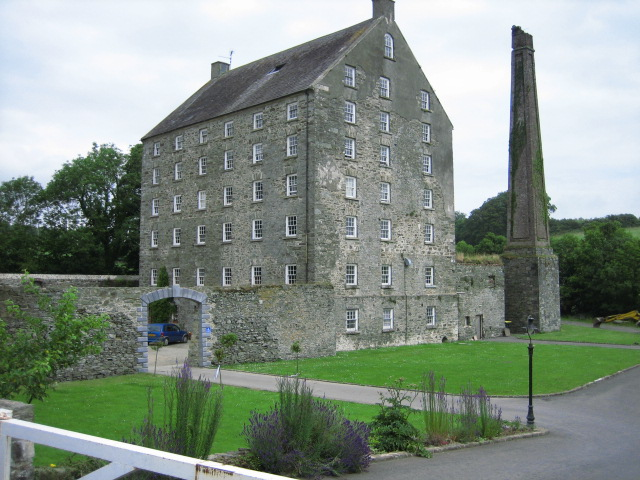
Starch mill at Ballydugan (Northern Ireland), built in 1792

West Philadelphia Starch works at Philadelphia (Pennsylvania), 1850

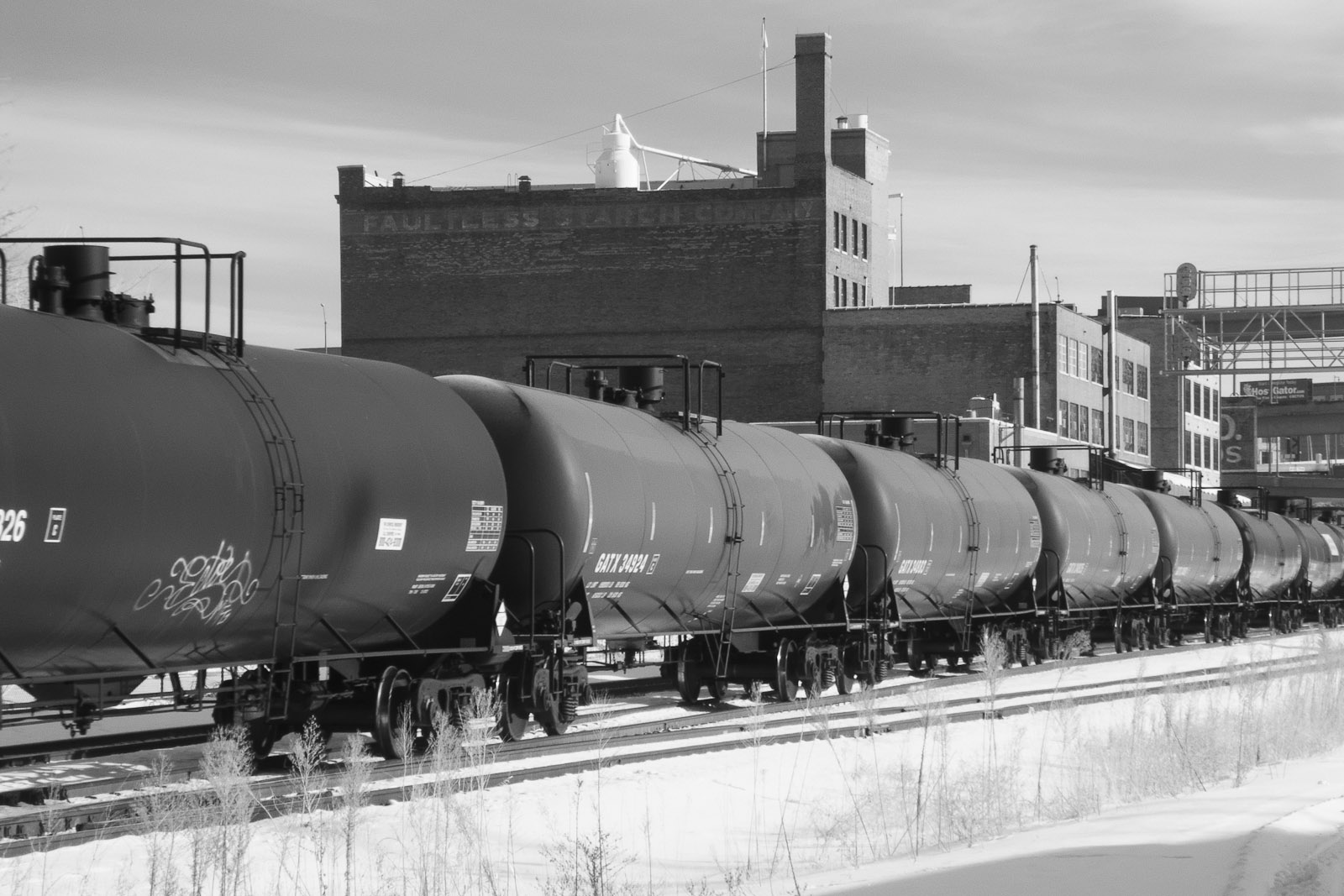
Faultless Starch Company at Kansas City

In addition to starchy plants consumed directly, 66 million tonnes of starch were processed industrially in 2008. By 2011, production had increased to 73 million tons.

In the EU the starch industry produced about 11 million tonnes in 2011, with around 40% being used for industrial applications and 60% for food uses, most of the latter as glucose syrups. In 2017 EU production was 11 million ton of which 9,4 million ton was consumed in the EU and of which 54% were starch sweeteners.

The US produced about 27.5 million tons of starch in 2017, of which about 8.2 million tons was high fructose syrup, 6.2 million tons was glucose syrups, and 2.5 million tons were starch products. The rest of the starch was used for producing ethanol (1.6 billion gallons).

=== Industrial processing ===
The starch industry extracts and refines starches from crops by wet grinding, washing, sieving and drying. Today, the main commercial refined starches are cornstarch, tapioca, arrowroot, and wheat, rice, and potato starches. To a lesser extent, sources of refined starch are sweet potato, sago and mung bean. To this day, starch is extracted from more than 50 types of plants.

Crude starch is processed on an industrial scale to maltodextrin and glucose syrups and fructose syrups. These massive conversions are mediated by a variety of enzymes, which break down the starch to varying extents. Here breakdown involves hydrolysis, i.e. cleavage of bonds between sugar subunits by the addition of water. Some sugars are isomerized. The processes have been described as occurring in two phases: liquefaction and saccharification. The liquefaction converts starch into dextrins. Amylase is a key enzyme for producing dextrin. The saccharification converts dextrin into maltoses and glucose. Diverse enzymes are used in this second phase, including pullanase and other amylases.

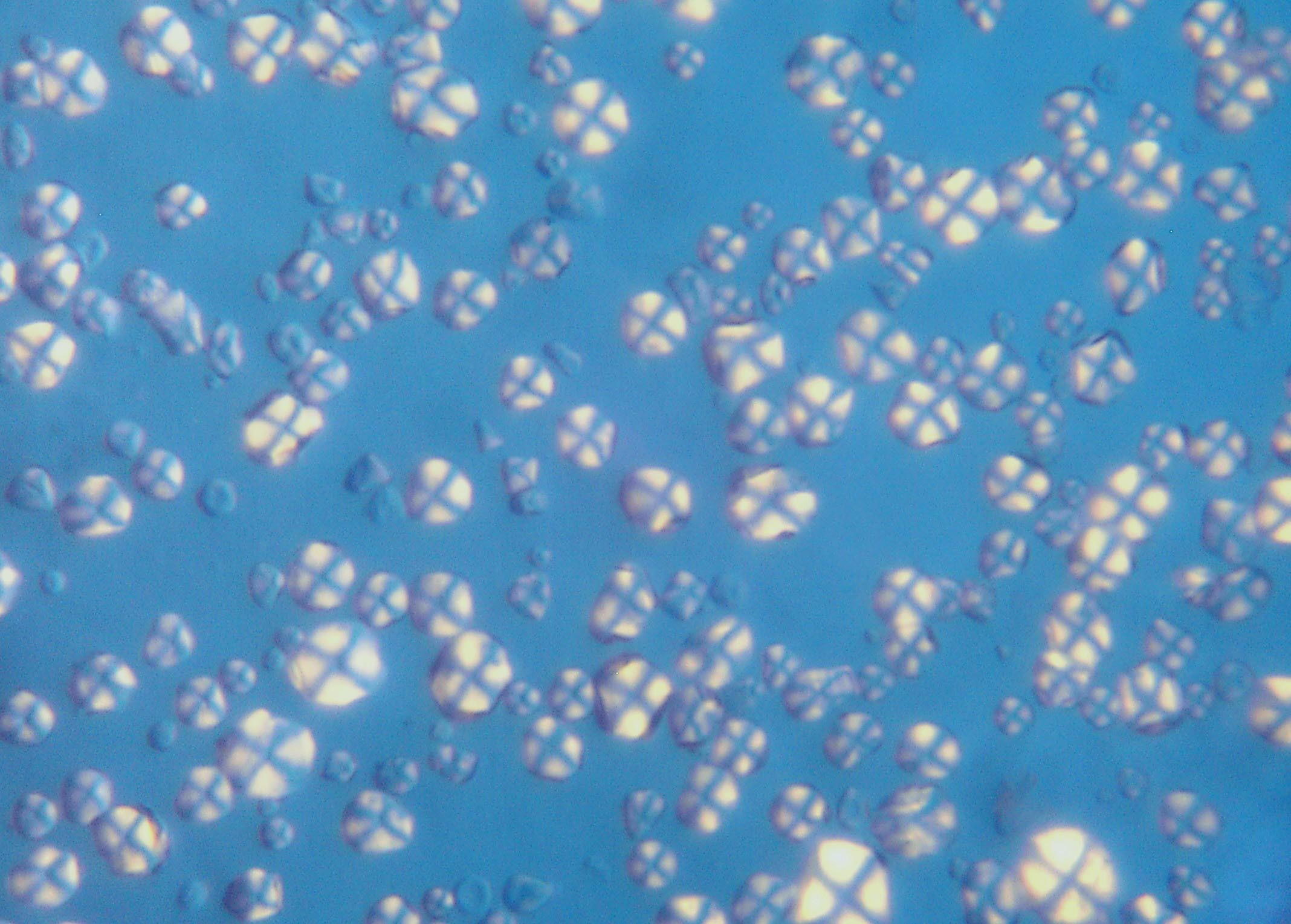
Corn starch, 800x magnified, under polarized light, showing characteristic extinction cross

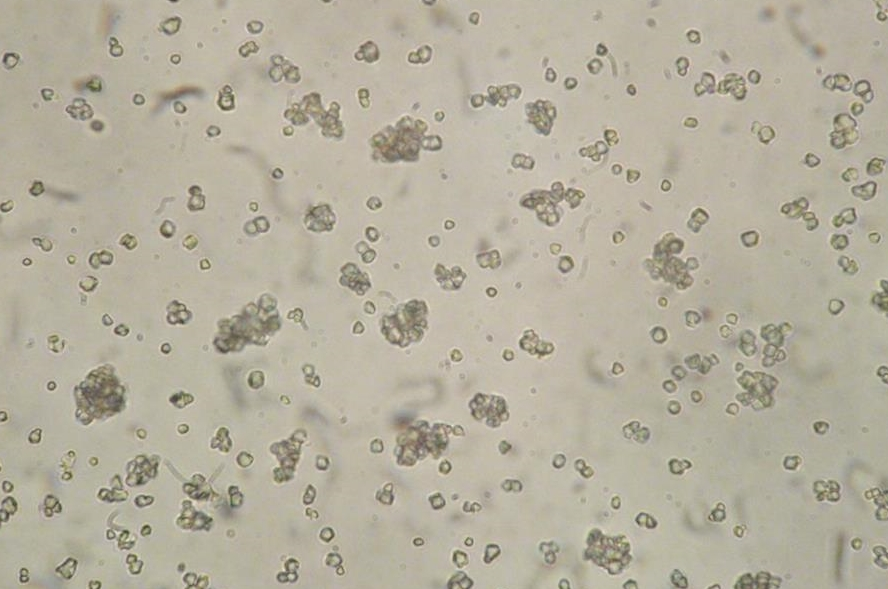
Rice starch under transmitted light microscopy. A characteristic of rice starch is that granules have an angular outline and tend to clump.

=== Dextrinization ===
If starch is subjected to dry heat, it breaks down to form dextrins, also called "pyrodextrins" in this context. This break down process is known as dextrinization. (Pyro)dextrins are mainly yellow to brown in color and dextrinization is partially responsible for the browning of toasted bread.

== Food ==
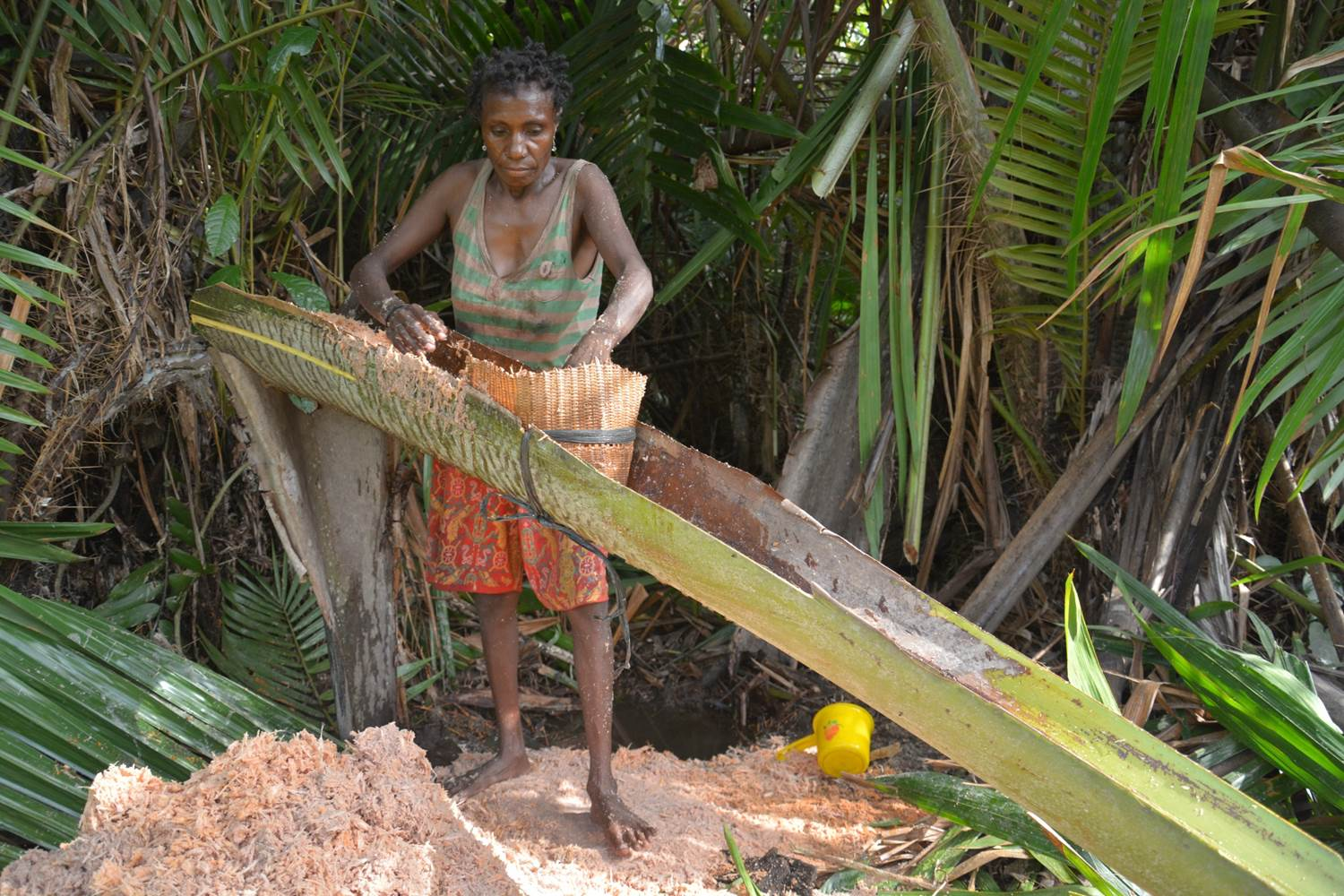
Sago starch extraction from palm stems

Starch is the most common carbohydrate in the human diet and is contained in many staple foods. The major sources of starch intake are the cereals (rice, wheat, and maize) and root vegetables (potatoes).

Before processed foods, people consumed large amounts of uncooked and unprocessed starchy plants that also contain high amounts of resistant starch. Microbes in the large intestine ferment or consume the starch, producing short-chain fatty acids. Upon cooking, starch is transformed into glucose chains with different nutritional and functional properties.

Highly processed foods are more easily digested, and release more glucose in the small intestine — less starch reaches the large intestine and more energy is absorbed by the body — a possible contributing factor to the development of metabolic syndrome, including obesity and diabetes.

Starch has been classified as rapidly digestible starch, slowly digestible starch and resistant starch, depending upon its digestion profile. Raw starch granules resist digestion by human enzymes and do not break down into glucose in the small intestine - they reach the large intestine instead and function as prebiotic dietary fiber.

Cost comparison of starchy foods to other food groups by region, 2021.

During cooking with high heat, sugars released from starch can react with amino acids via the Maillard reaction, forming advanced glycation end-products (AGEs), contributing aromas, flavors and texture to foods. Intestinal fermentation of dietary AGEs may be associated with risk of insulin resistance, atherosclerosis, diabetes and other inflammatory diseases.

=== Starch sugars ===
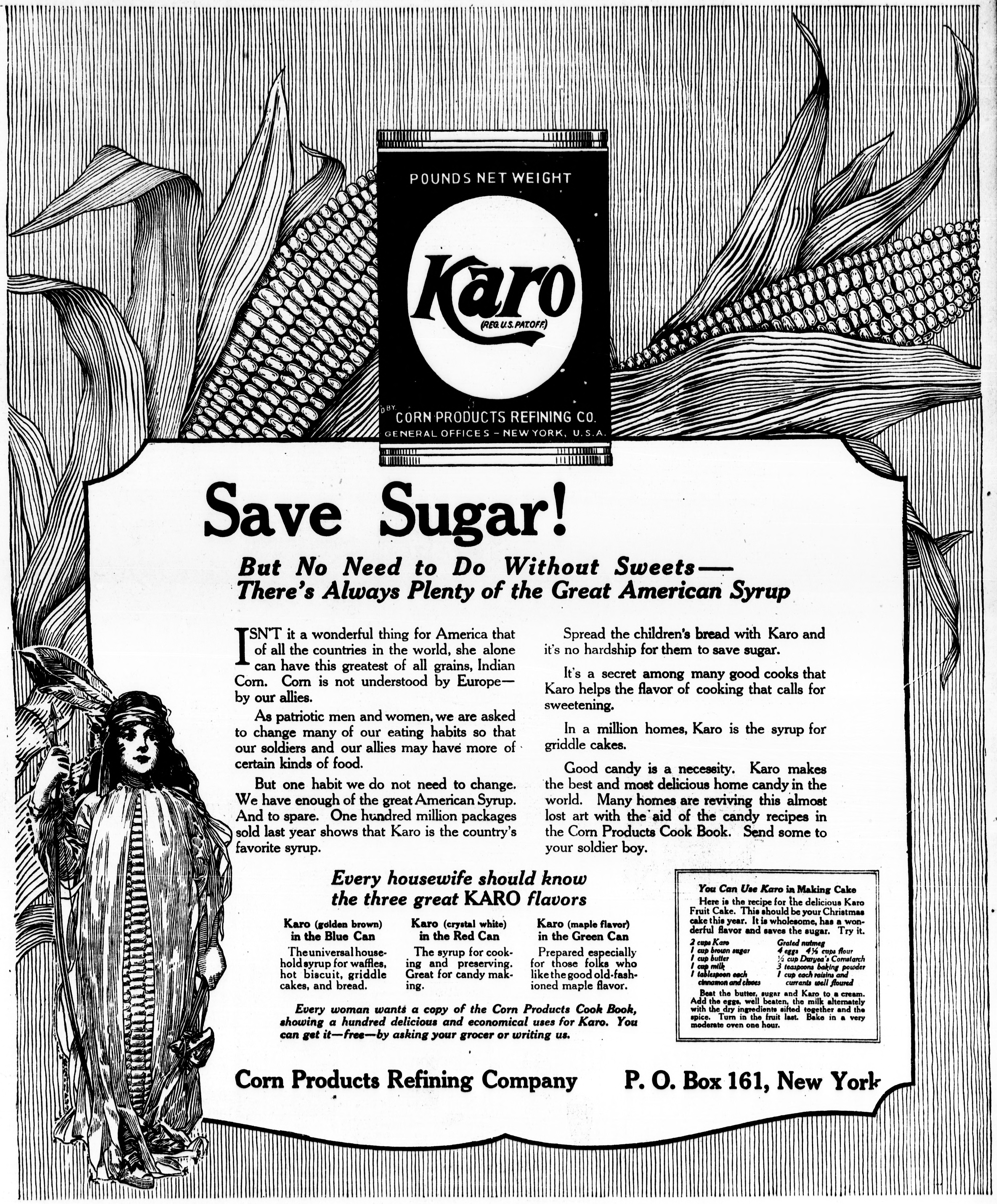
Karo corn syrup advert 1917

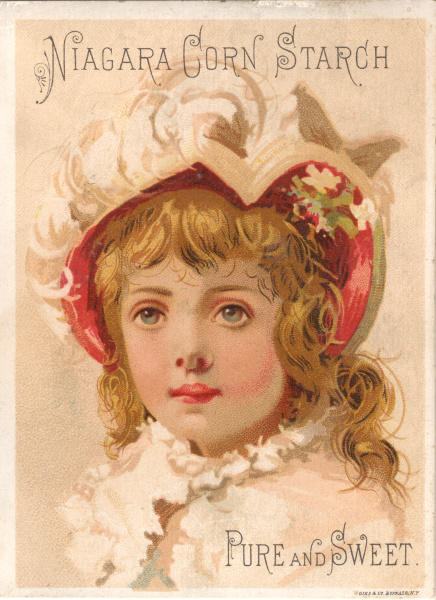
Niagara corn starch advert 1880s

Starch can be hydrolyzed into simpler carbohydrates by acids, various enzymes, or a combination of the two. The resulting fragments are known as dextrins.

These starch sugars are by far the most common starch based food ingredient and are used as sweeteners in many drinks and foods. They include:

- Maltodextrin, a lightly hydrolyzed (DE 10–20) starch product used as a bland-tasting filler and thickener.
- Various glucose syrups (DE 30–70), also called corn syrups in the US, viscous solutions used as sweeteners and thickeners in many kinds of processed foods.
- Dextrose (DE 100), commercial glucose, prepared by the complete hydrolysis of starch.
- High fructose syrup, made by treating dextrose solutions with the enzyme glucose isomerase, until a substantial fraction of the glucose has been converted to fructose. In the U.S. high-fructose corn syrup is significantly cheaper than sugar, and is the principal sweetener used in processed foods and beverages. Fructose also has better microbiological stability. One kind of high fructose corn syrup, HFCS-55, is sweeter than sucrose because it is made with more fructose, while the sweetness of HFCS-42 is on par with sucrose.
- Sugar alcohols, such as maltitol, erythritol, sorbitol, mannitol and hydrogenated starch hydrolysate, are sweeteners made by reducing sugars.

=== Modified starches ===
The modified food starches are E coded according to European Food Safety Authority and INS coded Food Additives according to the Codex Alimentarius:

- 1400 Dextrin
- 1401 Acid-treated starch
- 1402 Alkaline-treated starch
- 1403 Bleached starch
- 1404 Oxidized starch
- 1405 Starches, enzyme-treated
- 1410 Monostarch phosphate
- 1412 Distarch phosphate
- 1413 Phosphated distarch phosphate
- 1414 Acetylated distarch phosphate
- 1420 Acetylated starch
- 1422 Acetylated distarch adipate
- 1440 Hydroxypropyl starch
- 1442 Hydroxypropyl distarch phosphate
- 1443 Hydroxypropyl distarch glycerol
- 1450 Starch sodium octenyl succinate
- 1451 Acetylated oxidized starch

INS 1400, 1401, 1402, 1403 and 1405 are in the EU food ingredients without an E-number. Typical modified starches for technical applications are cationic starches, hydroxyethyl starch, carboxymethylated starches and thiolated starches.

=== Use as food additive ===
As an additive for food processing, food starches are typically used as thickeners and stabilizers in foods such as puddings, custards, soups, sauces, gravies, pie fillings, and salad dressings, and to make noodles and pastas. They function as thickeners, extenders, emulsion stabilizers and are exceptional binders in processed meats.

Gummed sweets such as jelly beans and wine gums are not manufactured using a mold in the conventional sense. A tray is filled with native starch and leveled. A positive mold is then pressed into the starch leaving an impression of 1,000 or so jelly beans. The jelly mix is then poured into the impressions and put onto a stove to set. This method greatly reduces the number of molds that must be manufactured.

=== Resistant starch ===
Resistant starch is starch that escapes digestion in the small intestine of healthy individuals. High-amylose starch from wheat or corn has a higher gelatinization temperature than other types of starch, and retains its resistant starch content through baking, mild extrusion and other food processing techniques. It is used as an insoluble dietary fiber in processed foods, such as bread, pasta, cookies, crackers, pretzels, and other low moisture foods. Resistant starch is under preliminary research for its potential to improve insulin resistance and markers of colonic function.

=== Synthetic starch ===
A cell-free chemoenzymatic process has been demonstrated to synthesize starch from CO_{2} and hydrogen. The chemical pathway of 11 core reactions was drafted by computational pathway design and converts CO_{2} to starch at a rate that is ~8.5-fold higher than starch synthesis in maize.

== Non-food applications ==
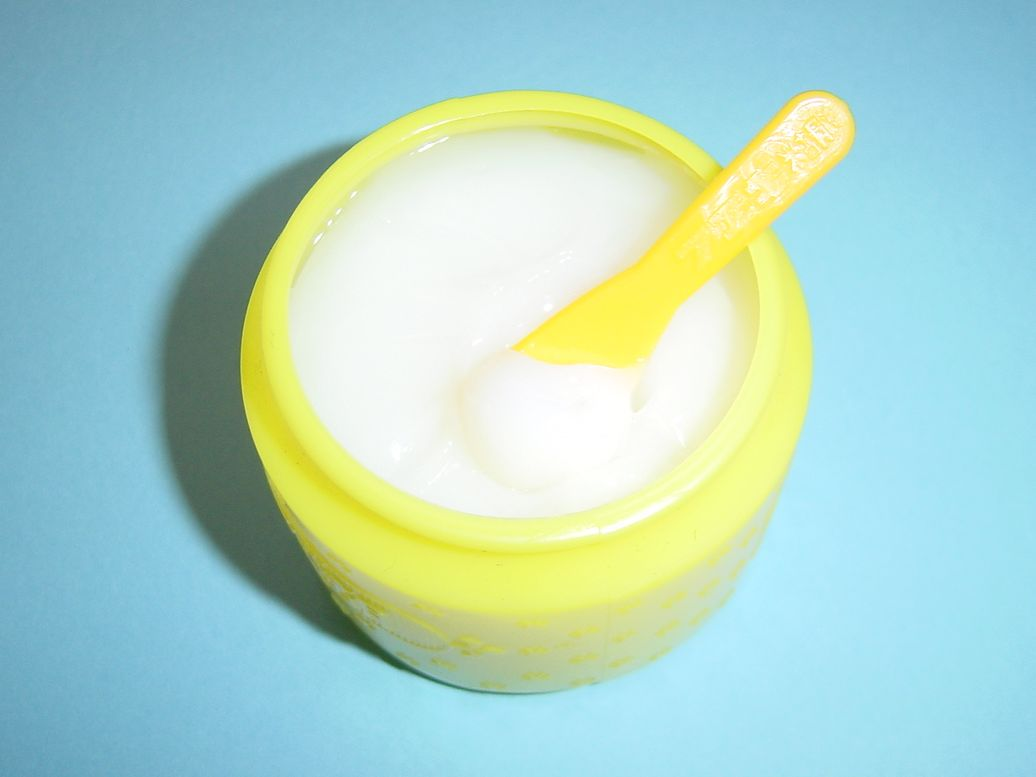
Starch adhesive

=== Papermaking ===
Papermaking is the largest non-food application for starches globally, consuming many millions of metric tons annually. In a typical sheet of copy paper for instance, the starch content may be as high as 8%. Both chemically modified and unmodified starches are used in papermaking. In the wet part of the papermaking process, generally called the "wet-end", the starches used are cationic and have a positive charge bound to the starch polymer. These starch derivatives associate with the anionic or negatively charged paper fibers / cellulose and inorganic fillers. Cationic starches together with other retention and internal sizing agents help to give the necessary strength properties to the paper web formed in the papermaking process (wet strength), and to provide strength to the final paper sheet (dry strength).

In the dry end of the papermaking process, the paper web is rewetted with a starch based solution. The process is called surface sizing. Starches used have been chemically, or enzymatically depolymerized at the paper mill or by the starch industry (oxidized starch). The size/starch solutions are applied to the paper web by means of various mechanical presses (size presses). Together with surface sizing agents the surface starches impart additional strength to the paper web and additionally provide water hold out or "size" for superior printing properties. Starch is also used in paper coatings as one of the binders for the coating formulations which include a mixture of pigments, binders and thickeners. Coated paper has improved smoothness, hardness, whiteness and gloss and thus improves printing characteristics.

=== Adhesives ===
Corrugated board adhesives are the next largest application of non-food starches globally. Starch glues are mostly based on unmodified native starches, plus some additive such as borax and caustic soda. Part of the starch is gelatinized to carry the slurry of uncooked starches and prevent sedimentation. This opaque glue is called a SteinHall adhesive. The glue is applied on tips of the fluting. The fluted paper is pressed to paper called liner. This is then dried under high heat, which causes the rest of the uncooked starch in glue to swell/gelatinize. This gelatinizing makes the glue a fast and strong adhesive for corrugated board production.

Starch is used in the manufacture of various adhesives or glues for book-binding, wallpaper adhesives, paper sack production, tube winding, gummed paper, envelope adhesives, school glues and bottle labeling. Starch derivatives, such as yellow dextrins, can be modified by addition of some chemicals to form a hard glue for paper work; some of those forms use borax or soda ash, which are mixed with the starch solution at 50–70 °C (122–158 °F) to create a very good adhesive. Sodium silicate can be added to reinforce these formula.

A related large non-food starch application is in the construction industry, where starch is used in the gypsum wall board manufacturing process. Chemically modified or unmodified starches are added to the stucco containing primarily gypsum. Top and bottom heavyweight sheets of paper are applied to the formulation, and the process is allowed to heat and cure to form the eventual rigid wall board. The starches act as a glue for the cured gypsum rock with the paper covering, and also provide rigidity to the board.

=== Other ===
- Clothing or laundry starch is used in the laundering of clothes. It was widely used in Europe in the 16th and 17th centuries.
- Textile chemicals from starch: warp sizing agents are used to reduce breaking of yarns during weaving. Starch is mainly used to size cotton based yarns. Modified starch is also used as textile printing thickener.
- In oil exploration, starch is used to adjust the viscosity of drilling fluid, which is used to lubricate the drill head and suspend the grinding residue in petroleum extraction.
- Starch is also used to make some packing peanuts, and some drop ceiling tiles.
- In the printing industry, food grade starch is used in the manufacture of anti-set-off spray powder used to separate printed sheets of paper to avoid wet ink being set off.
- For body powder, powdered corn starch is used as a substitute for talcum powder, and similarly in other health and beauty products.
- Starch is used to produce various bioplastics, synthetic polymers that are biodegradable. An example is polylactic acid based on glucose from starch.
- Glucose from starch can be further fermented to biofuel corn ethanol using the so-called wet milling process. Today most bioethanol production plants use the dry milling process to ferment corn or other feedstock directly to ethanol.
- In the pharmaceutical industry, starch is also used as an excipient, as tablet disintegrant, and as binder. Synthetic amylose made from cellulose has a well-controlled degree of polymerization. Therefore, it can be used as a potential drug deliver carrier.

== Chemical tests ==
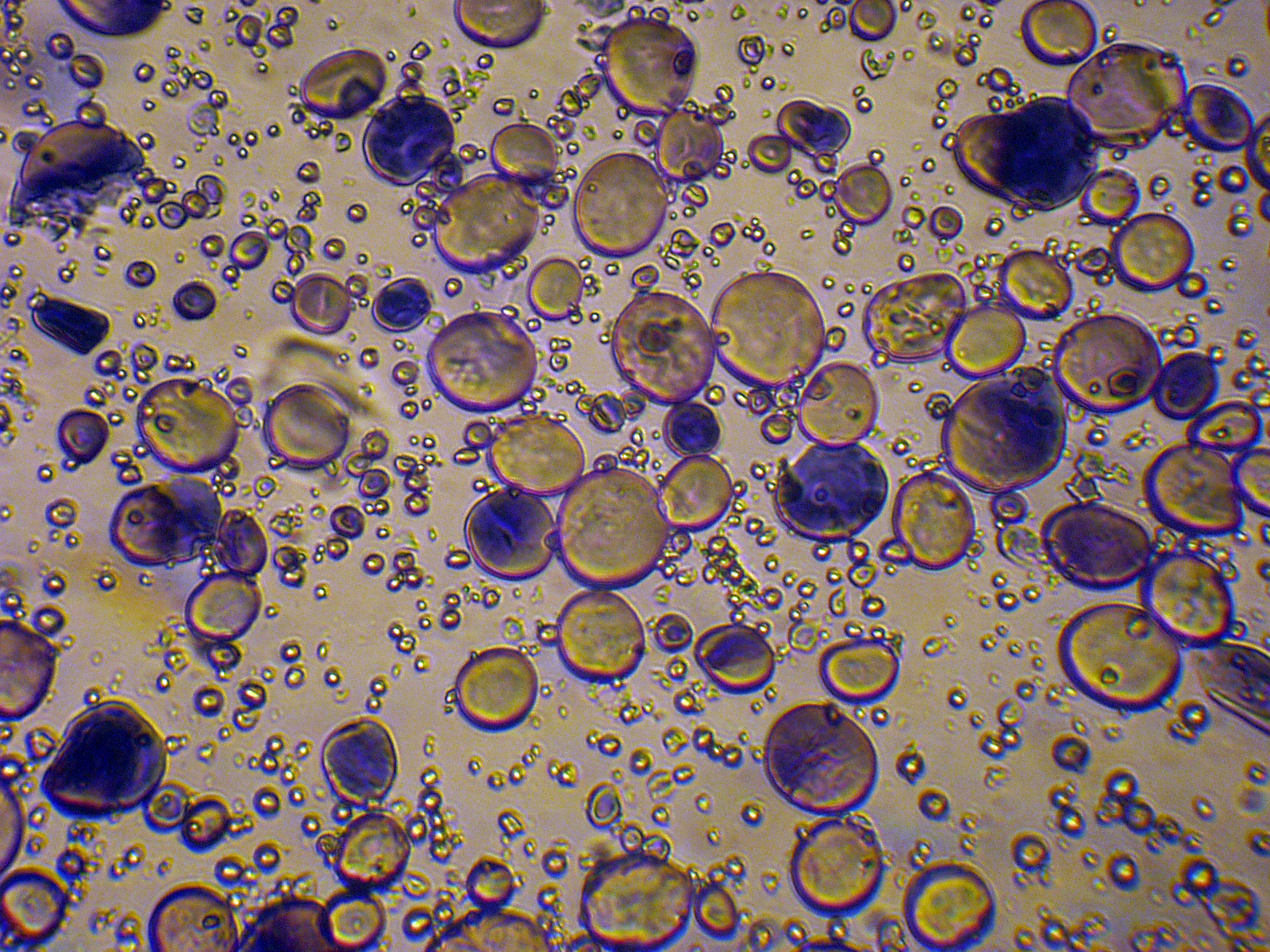
Granules of wheat starch, stained with iodine, photographed through a light microscope

A solution of triiodide (I_{3}^{−}) (formed by mixing iodine and potassium iodide) can be used to test for starch. The colorless solution turns dark blue in the presence of starch. The strength of the resulting blue color depends on the amount of amylose present. Waxy starches with little or no amylose present will color red. Benedict's test and Fehling's test is also done to indicate the presence of starch.

== Safety ==
In the US, the Occupational Safety and Health Administration (OSHA) has set the legal limit (Permissible exposure limit) for starch exposure in the workplace as 15 mg/m^{3} total exposure and 5 mg/m^{3} respiratory exposure over an eight-hour workday. The National Institute for Occupational Safety and Health (NIOSH) has set a Recommended exposure limit (REL) of 10 mg/m^{3} total exposure and 5 mg/m^{3} respiratory exposure over an eight-hour workday.

== See also ==
- Destarch
- Potato starch
- Resistant starch
- Starch analysis
