= GWD =

GWD may refer to:

== Biology and medicine ==
- Alpha-glucan, water dikinase
- Guinea worm disease

== Transport ==
- Gwadar International Airport, Balochistan, Pakistan
- Greenwood station (Mississippi), United States

== Other uses ==
- Gawwada language, spoken in Ethiopia
- Global Wind Day, celebrating wind power
