= Retrograde =

Retrograde may refer to:

== Film and television ==
- Retrograde (2004 film), a film by Christopher Kulikowski
- Retrograde (2022 American film), a documentary film by Matthew Heineman
- Retrograde (2022 Canadian film), a drama film by Adrian Murray
- Retrograde (TV series), a 2020 Australian television comedy series

== Medicine and science ==
- Retrograde amnesia, a loss of memory-access to past events
- Retrograde ejaculation, the redirection of ejaculated semen into the urinary bladder
- Retrograde metamorphism, the recrystallization of rocks under decreasing pressure and/or temperature
- Retrograde motion, an orbit in the opposite direction of the rotation of the central mass or most other satellites
- Retrograde signaling, the process where a signal travels backwards from a target source to its original source
- Apparent retrograde motion, the apparent motion of planets as observed from a particular vantage point

== Music and entertainment ==
- Retrograde (album), a 2016 album by Crown the Empire
- Retrograde (Dinah Jane song), a 2019 single by Dinah Jane
- Retrograde (James Blake song), a 2013 single from the album Overgrown
- "Retrograde", a song from Maggie Rogers' 2019 album, Heard It in a Past Life
- Retrograde (music), the playing back of a passage of notes
- Retrograde (Pearl Jam song), a 2019 single by American rock band Pearl Jam
- Retrograde (play), a 2023 play
- Retrograde inversion, a type of musical permutation
- Retro/Grade, a video game developed by 24 Caret Games

== Other uses ==
- Retrograde analysis, in chess problems
- Reverse dictionary, sometimes called retrograde dictionary
- Retrograde indication, in horology, a type of complication

== See also ==
- Retrogradation, a landward change in position of the front of a river delta with time
- Retrogradation (starch), the gelatinization of starch when the amylose and amylopectin chains realign themselves
