= Retrogradation (starch) =

Gelatinization of starch

Retrogradation is a process in which the amylose and amylopectin chains in cooked, gelatinized starch realign themselves as the cooked starch cools.

When native starch is heated and dissolved in water, the crystalline structure of amylose and amylopectin molecules is lost and they hydrate to form a viscous solution. If the viscous solution is cooled or left at lower temperature for a long enough period, the linear molecules, amylose, and linear parts of amylopectin molecules recrystallize. The linear chains place themselves parallel and form hydrogen bonds.

At temperatures between −8 °C (18 °F) and 8 °C (46 °F), the aging process is enhanced drastically. Amylose crystallization occurs much faster than crystallization of the amylopectin. The crystal melting temperature of amylose is much higher (about 150 °C (302 °F)) than amylopectin (about 50–60 °C (122–140 °F)). The temperature range between cooking starch and storing in room temperature is optimum for amylose crystallization, and therefore amylose crystallization is responsible for the development of the initial hardness of the starch gel. On the other hand, amylopectin has a narrower temperature range for crystallization as crystallization does not occur at a temperature higher than its melting temperature. Therefore, amylopectin is responsible for development of the long-term crystallinity and gel structure.

Retrogradation can expel water from the polymer network. This process is known as syneresis. A small amount of water can be seen on top of the gel.

Retrogradation is directly related to the staling or aging of bread. Retrograded starch is a type of resistant starch.

Chemical modification of starches can reduce or enhance the retrogradation. Waxy, high amylopectin, starches also have much less of a tendency to retrograde. Additives such as fat, glucose, sodium nitrate and emulsifier can reduce retrogradation of starch.

== See also ==
- Retrograde (disambiguation)
- Retrogradation – Movement of the front of a river delta inland over time
