= Phosphated distarch phosphate =

Modified resistant starch

Identifiers
CAS Number	11120-02-8
ChemSpider	none
ECHA InfoCard	100.131.985
E number	E1413 (additional chemicals)
CompTox Dashboard (EPA)	DTXSID8093946
- Except where otherwise noted, data are given for materials in their standard state (at 25 °C [77 °F], 100 kPa). verify (what is ?) Infobox references

Phosphated distarch phosphate is a variation of distarch phosphate, a chemically modified starch. It can be derived from wheat starch, tapioca starch, potato starch or many other botanical sources of starch. It is produced by replacing the hydrogen bonds between starch chains by stronger, covalent phosphate bonds that are more permanent. It is manufactured by treating starch with sodium tripolyphosphate (STPP) and sodium trimetaphosphate (STMP), or phosphoryl chloride (POCl_{3}). Phosphorylated cross-linked starches is a category of modified food starches within the U.S. Code of Federal Regulations. Starches treated with STMP and STPP must not exceed 0.4 percent phosphorus as residual phosphate.

Phosphated distarch phosphate starches can be used as a food additive (E1413) as a freeze-thaw-stable thickener (stabilises the consistency of the foodstuff when frozen and thawed) within the European Union in products such as soups, sauces, frozen gravies and pie fillings.

Depending upon the degree of modification, phosphated distarch phosphate starch can contain 70%-85% type RS4 resistant starch and can replace high glycemic flour in functional bread and other baked goods. Replacing flour with chemically modified resistant starch increases the dietary fiber and lowers the calorie content of foods.

In 2011, the European Food Safety Authority approved a health claim that all types of resistant starch, including modified resistant starch, can reduce the post-prandial glycemic response in foods when the high carbohydrate baked food contains at least 14% of total starch as resistant starch.

In 2019, the U.S. Food and Drug Administration, approved "cross-linked phosphorylated RS4", regardless of source, as dietary fiber on food labels.

== See also ==
- Modified starch
- Resistant starch
