= Starch analysis =

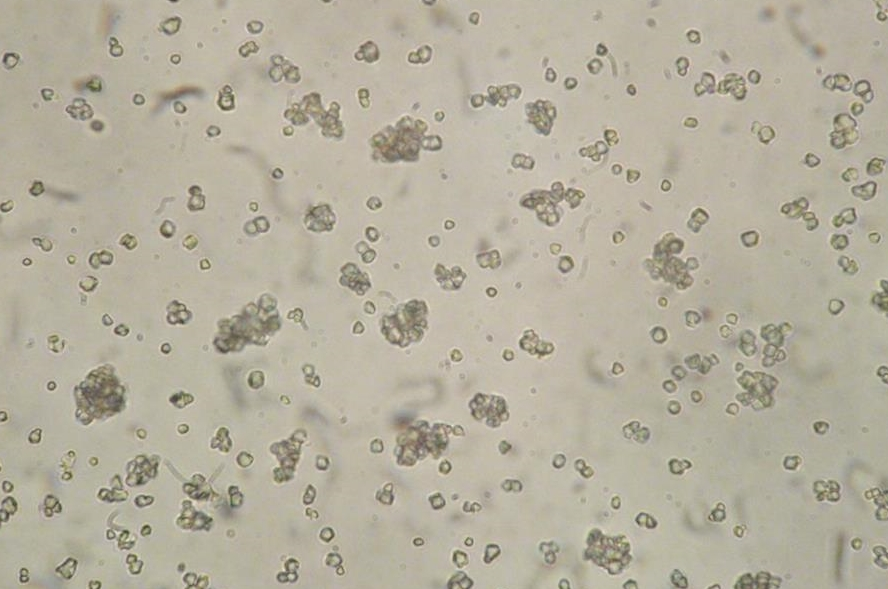
Rice starch grains with angular outline and clumping attraction

Starch analysis or starch grain analysis is a technique that is useful in archaeological research in determining plant taxa on a microscopic level. It can also be used in day-to-day life by specialists within the pharmaceutical and food industries in order to determine taxa origins and food quality. Specifically in regards to archaeology though, the identification of starch grains, through this context is done by comparison identification, in which several attributes of the grains are compared to other known samples in order to determine the type. This comparison technique, when done microscopically allows for the specific taxa identification of starch grains found on specific artifacts, such as ground stone tools, within soils, through dental calculus, or found in reference to ceramic vessels. Starch grain analysis can be helpful as a supplement to other forms of study to understanding tool use, agricultural activities, as well as other plant based subsistence strategies, and to reconstruct plant based diets throughout time.

== Starch Grain ==
First, starch is stored as a source of energy and found in most autotrophic plants, meaning plants that are able to create their own food through photosynthesis. There are a few exceptions to this however, within the families Asteraceae, Campanulaceae, and some others in which starch is not used as a source of energy that is reserved. This presents one downfall to the studying of plant taxa through starch grain analysis. Moving on, the ability for long-term storage of starch grains for an energy source utilized by plants, makes starch grains a valuable source of study within an archaeological context. Starch is stored in the amyloplasts, a specialized organelle found within plant cells, as starch grains. The starch grain is specifically important for study due to the fact that it is commonly found in most plants, its long-lasting nature, as well as the diverse forms and structures that they can take based on which taxa they belong to.

== Starch Grain Lab Techniques ==
=== Staining Solutions ===
Staining solutions are one way to make comparative analysis of starch granules more accessible, depending on what type of stain is specifically used. For example, as stated by Kovárník and Benes, Lugol's solution stains the grains a dark blue color, in order to distinguish the starch grain from other common structures that can appear similar in size and shape. In addition to this technique, the use of CongoRed dye marks the damage, making it easier to study, compare, and to analyze differences in the damage of particular taxa. Specifically, the intensity of the red color depends on how damaged the grain is. Lastly, Trypan blue is another way to stain grain damage within starch grains, only staining the damaged grains, not the undamaged. Specifically, it can be important to incorporate the staining process into an analysis due to the fact that there are several other structures found naturally that have similar characteristics to starch when compared under a microscope.

=== Starch Extraction in the Context of Archaeological Tools ===
There are several ways to go about extracting the starch granules from stone tools. One technique as explained by Kovárnik and Benes described as the most common, is through pipetting the surface of the objects on the most common areas in which starch grains are found, for example fissures, or others divetts on the artifact. The water droplets from the pipetting technique are then collected onto slides to be utilized in comparative analysis. This is a common technique for the use of understanding specifically how stone tools were used, and what types of plants were being exploited during the time being studied.

Another common approach is to dislodge the starch grains through sonication, which is a laboratory technique that uses sound waves to "agitate particles" in order to convert an electrical signal into a vibration which in turn breaks down a substance. In terms of starch grain analysis, the starch grains are released by use of an ultrasonic bath and the distilled water containing the sample particles is then centrifuged. This is the process in which the specimens are spun and separated by density as a result of centripetal force, or due to the fictitious centrifugal force that is felt by the specimens due to their reference frame. Utilizing this force allows for the separation of solutions of different densities. Thus the least dense component, consisting of the starch grain particles is separated and a microscopic slide can be prepared.

=== Starch Grain: Dental Calculus Removal Methods ===
Starch grain analysis through dental calculus can provide a plethora of information when it come to diet reconstruction of past societies. Specifically, dental calculus is a layering found on the teeth that is formed from plaque, "after mineralization."

In a study conducted by Tao et al., the research group followed the methods laid out by Piperno and Dillehay in 2008 and Li et al. in 2010. In these specific examples, they ground the dental calculus by use of mortar and pestle, and centrifuged the mixture containing the dental calculus as well as small amounts of Calgon in order to break the particles into a dispersed state. Once the extracts were dissolved in hydrochloride and rinsed with acetone, the residues were extracted and comparative analysis could begin. This is just one way in which to go about extracting starch grain residues from dental calculus, with another example being the use of sonification as described above.

=== Starch Grain: Comparative Structures ===
There are several structures that are observed when doing comparative analysis to determine the plant taxa in which the starch grain belongs. First, starting on a slightly larger scale, the granule types such as simple, compound, or semi-compound, sizes, and shapes are observed. Next there is the hilum, which is the area in which protein layers are deposited. Hilums differ in their positioning on the starch granule and this positioning can differ between taxa. In addition to the hilum, "lamellas" are observed which are the different growth layers in which are only sometimes visible microscopically. The fissures can also be observed, however these are only common in some starch grains, not all. In total, starch grain analysis through the use of a computer database is the primary way in which starch grains are differentiated. This is helpful in terms of a supplemental approach to understanding plant exploitation of past societies.

== Usefulness ==
Starch grain analysis is not a perfect science, however, plant starch grain analysis is a diagnostic feature of multiple applications according to the peculiarities and to the origin of the plant material. The size, shape and structure of grains from plant species, varies little, which can lead to identification. Starch grains have been removed and identified from stone tools, ceramic sherds, organic materials, dental calculus, and sediments and animal remains to determine diet and when humans began to exploit wild food varieties.

== Disadvantages ==
In some cases the grains can become degraded. Factors such as heat and water absorption may affect the structure of the grains, making identification more difficult. Even if the remains are well preserved, water logging, dehydration, desiccation or damage from fungi can destroy the starch. In some cases, even within the same species, starch grains can differ in shape and size and the size of the grain affects its survivability in the archaeological record.

== Biology of starch ==
Starch is produced in plants as a form of energy storage through the process of photosynthesis. When the plant is in need of energy, the stored starch is converted back into glucose.

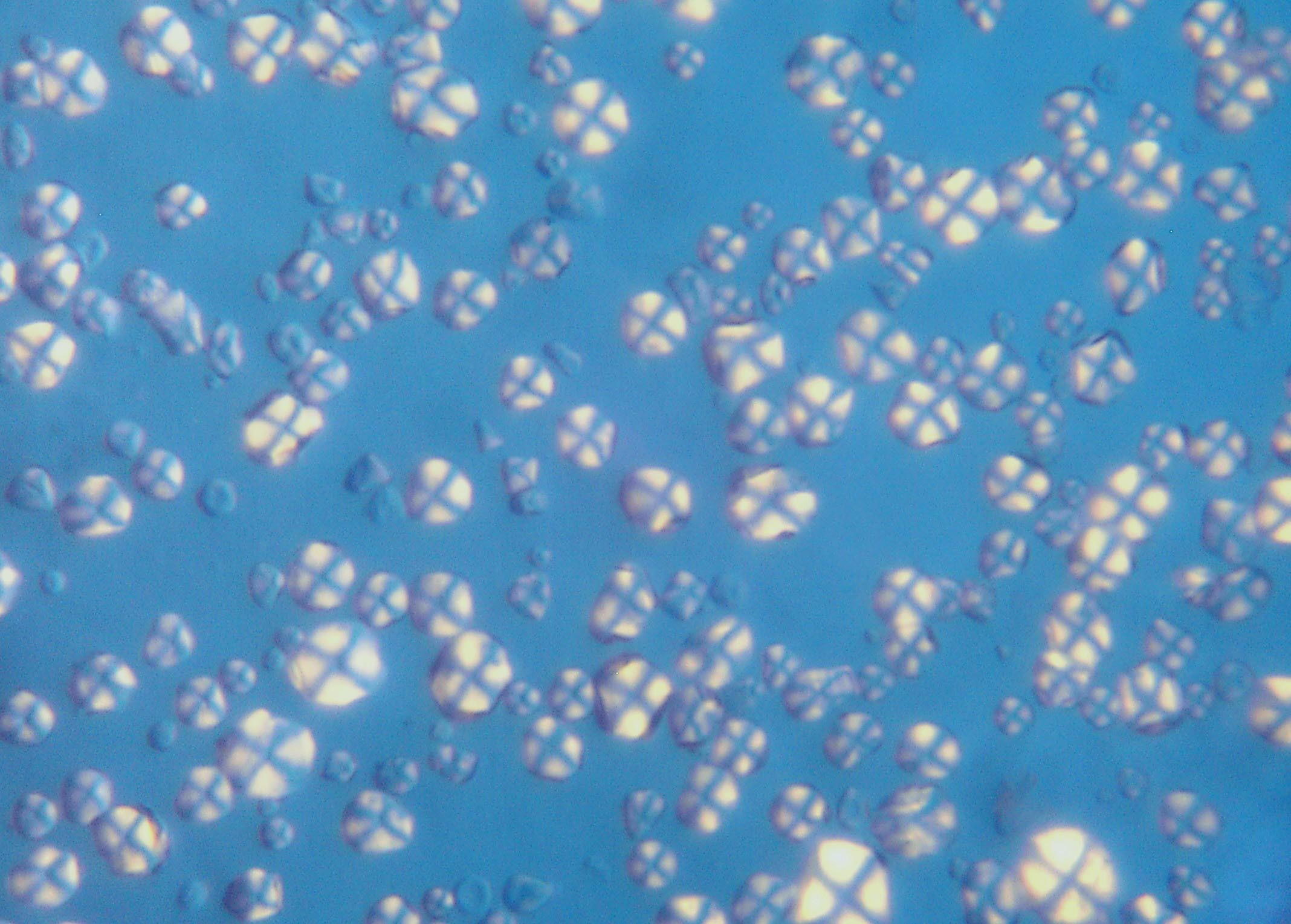
Starch, 800x magnified, under polarized light, showing characteristic extinction cross

Starch grains are typically microscopically identified with either optical or electron microscopy. Starch grains can become clearer if they are stained a darker color with Iodine Stains. Logol's Iodine is one, used for staining starch because iodine reagents easily bind to starch but less easily to other materials. Features that allow identification of starch grains include: presence of hilum (core of the grain), lamellae (or growth layers), birefringence, and extinction cross (a cross shape, visible on grains under revolving polarized light) which are visible with a microscope and shape and size.

=== Low magnification ===
Archaeological research focused on residue adhering to artifacts start at lower magnifications, commonly using a stereoscope. Most data obtained at this stage is qualitative, an important first stage to fuller analysis. Magnifications of between x10 and x50 are sufficient to locate target residues, describe features and confirm internal structures of the identified residues.

=== High magnification ===
Modern light, high powered microscopes have an internal light source, allowing illumination with both transmitted and reflected light. These microscopes can provide a magnification of up to x1000: good enough to provide clear images of starch granules as small as a few micrometres in diameter.

Starch granules show different sizes. For example;

- Tapioca starch: 5-35 μm
- Potato starch: 15-100 μm
- Maize starch: 5-25 μm
- Rice starch: 3-8 μm

but all are generally under 100 micrometres in size, and are, therefore, best observed under compound microscopes equipped with various lighting conditions and magnifications from x200 to x800.

The starch grains are also compared to standard reference collections for comparison. Archaeologists and researchers can consider four issues in classification of the plant(s) and its use(s):

- Determination of whether evidence for the utilization of plants is present
- Study of the assemblage variation
- Determination of the presence of particular plant species
- Assign percentages of starch granules within a sample to a particular taxon, and present quantitative data regarding relative abundance within the sample. Identification of ancient starch is fairly easily for the first three levels of classification, whilst the fourth level requires continued improvement in the description, classification, and identification of individual starch granules.

== Starch in sediments ==
Starch granules retrieved from sediments are used to reconstruct the habitats associated with human land use. Such studies address two areas of interest to the archaeologist:

- landscapes; specifically the reconstruction of historical plant communities at the widest scale of the environment
- specific contexts, such as settlements or activity areas; focusing on individual archaeological sites, or separate contexts within them, with the goal of identify specific human activities at a particular location.

The stages involved in the analysis of starch from sediments are; sampling, extraction of starch, slide mounting and viewing, and interpretation.

=== Sampling ===
Sampling a sediment core or stratigraphic profile to gather information about an environment requires a detailed understanding of the way the sediments were formed.

=== Extraction ===
Most extraction techniques follow a general methodology of:

- sample preparation (sieving, drying, or soaking)
- disaggregation and deflocculation to break up the elements of the sample into single particles
- removal of undesired particles (sands, silts, minerals, organics).
- chemicals preservation of the starch granules.

=== Slide mounting and viewing ===
Starch granules are mounted onto a slide, using a variety of mounting medias including, but not limited, to water, glycerol, and glycerine jelly. It is important that the material is dried thoroughly before being mounted to ensure that no further degradation of the sample occurs. The slide is then viewed, as appropriate, for identification and counting.

=== Interpretation ===
After the starch granules have been examined, the findings are then recorded and interpreted with respect to the research questions that are being investigated.

== Starch on artifacts ==
Artifacts collect starch granules and protect them from decay due to microorganisms, thus providing excellent conditions for long-term preservation. The analysis may focus on the function of the tool, to examine a broader range of human behaviour but starch analysis also allows insights into craft activities involving the preparation of adhesives, medicines, or other nonfood items.

== Modified starch ==
Starch can also be investigated when it is not in its raw form. For example, Modified starch is created when the morphological or physico-chemical structure of native starch is disrupted in some way, such as in food preparation. The most common way to modify starch is to apply heat. Cooking pits, hearths, and ovens that may have come into contact with starchy material yield modified starches which can provide other insights.

Modified starch is only likely to be preserved under specific conditions, such as arid regions because of its susceptibility to organic decay. Studies of ancient modified starch aid understanding of ancient food technology, variations in cuisine among different social groups, as well as provide an understanding the function of ancient food-processing equipment.

Preserved forms of modified starch include:

- Discrete desiccated macroremains: coherent foods that are not attached to any other object and are among the most easily recognizable ancient starchy prepared foodstuffs. They can be either the intended final prepared food, like loaves of bread, or intermediate products of the food processing sequence, like starch-rich, chaffy lumps.
- Attached desiccated residues: collections of starchy foodstuffs adhered to a container or vessel. The ability to identify these residues is affected by the quantity and appearance of the residue, as well as the awareness of the excavators. Residues containing obvious plant tissue are most easily recognizable, while thin smears are not as easy to recognize.
- Charred residues: normally the result of accidental overcooking and can be preserved as discrete fragments or remain stuck to the cooking vessel. Due to their charred nature, these residues are very difficult to identify.

== See also ==
- Starch

== Bibliography ==
- Hather, J.G. (ed.) 1994. Tropical Archaeobotany: Applications and New Developments, pp. 86–114. Routledge, London.
- Messner, Timothy C. 2011. Acorns and Bitter Roots: Starch Grain Research in the Prehistoric Eastern Woodlands. University of Alabama Press, Tuscaloosa, AL.
- Torrence, Robin (2006), Ancient Starch Research, Walnut Creek, CA: Left Coast Press Inc., ISBN 978-1-59874-018-9
