= Hydroxypropyl distarch phosphate =

Names
- Other names: Hydroxypropyl di-starch phosphate; Hydroxypropylated distarch phosphate

Identifiers
CAS Number	53124-00-8
ECHA InfoCard	100.110.622
EC Number	610-966-0
E number	E1442 (additional chemicals)
CompTox Dashboard (EPA)	DTXSID20895152
- Except where otherwise noted, data are given for materials in their standard state (at 25 °C [77 °F], 100 kPa). Infobox references

Hydroxypropyl distarch phosphate (HDP) is a modified resistant starch. It is currently used as a food additive (INS number 1442). It is approved for use in the European Union (listed as E1442), the United States, Australia, Taiwan, and New Zealand.

== See also ==
- Modified starch
- Silicon dioxide
