= Anti-set-off spray powder =

Page separation powder used in printing

In printing, anti-set-off spray powder is used to make an air gap between printed sheets of paper. This enables the ink to dry naturally and therefore avoid the unwanted transfer of ink from one printed sheet to another. The problem can occur with most types of printing.

Anti-set-off spray powder is generally made from natural starches from plants and vegetables. There remains a demand for soluble powders (sometimes known as vanished powders) based on natural sugars which are often used when the final printed sheet is to be varnished. In addition there is still a relatively small amount of powder made from minerals (e.g. Calcium Carbonate, rather than Talc) used in offset litho printing; however these mineral powders are not so popular because of the potential health implications and abrasive properties.

Spray powder is used to separate printed sheets to enable air to naturally dry the printing ink. The diameter of the powder used is relative to the density (g/m^{2}) of the stock (paper or board) being printed. For 150 g/m^{2} paper the ideal anti-set-off spray powder would be 15 μm in diameter, for 200 g/m^{2} 20 μm, through to 70 μm for heavy board (700 g/m^{2}).

Most manufactures of spray powder offer both coated and uncoated powders. Uncoated powders are generally less expensive and are based on natural food-grade starches typically derived from corn (maize), wheat, semolina, potato, tapioca and rice depending on the diameter required. Coated powders use the same range of raw materials but are encapsulated with a minuscule amount of natural coatings which enable the powders to flow freely though the spray guns on sheet-fed offset-litho printing presses. Enhanced versions of these coatings are used to give specific electrostatic (anti-static) and hydrophobic properties.

Spray powder is not used on rotary presses including rotary letterpress, web offset (often used for printing magazines), flexographic (often used for printing flexible packaging and labels) or gravure (often used for printing long-run catalogues). Similarly, spray powder is not generally used in sheet-fed (silk) screen-printing, ink-jet or toner based digital printing.

== Modern developments ==
As health and safety has become more important to the environment and to the work forces, a small number of anti-set-off spray powder manufacturers had introduced highly clarified powders by 2007, in advance of EU legislation. This new generation of powders have typically less than 3% of particles of less than 10 μm and almost no particles below 5 μm which are generally regarded in the industry as dust. To put this in context typical human hair is 20 – 40 μm.

The printing industry regards anti-set-off spray powder as a necessary evil. Ideally printers would prefer not to use it, but it remains the only practical way to ensure a stack of printed paper at the end of a printing press does not set-off. In recent years there has been an emergence of printing presses which use inks that are cured (dried) with powerful UV lamps. As each sheet is individually dried there is no need for spray powder. However, as these machines require specialty inks which are much more expensive than conventional inks, and the UV lamps use a significant amount of energy, the vast majority of new sheet-fed presses sold in 2007 still used anti-set-off spray powder.

== Other uses ==
In addition to its use in the printing and packaging industry, spray powder is also used in the manufacture of float glass to enable the large sheets to slide easily over each other. It is also used in the manufacture of plastic food wrap and similar products to help prevent pieces of plastic from sticking together because of static electricity. In the UK, many carrom players use a version of anti-set-off spray powder from the printing industry which has specific electrostatic properties with particles of 50 micrometres in diameter.

== See also ==
- Lithography
- Set-off (printing)
- See also Printing
