= Acetylated distarch adipate =

- Representative portion of the chemical structure showing sugar (black), acetyl (red), and adipate (blue) groups

Identifiers
CAS Number	63798-35-6
ECHA InfoCard	100.118.689
E number	E1422 (additional chemicals)
CompTox Dashboard (EPA)	DTXSID201010959

Properties
Chemical formula	Variable
Molar mass	Variable
- Except where otherwise noted, data are given for materials in their standard state (at 25 °C [77 °F], 100 kPa). verify (what is ?) Infobox references

Acetylated distarch adipate (E1422) is a food additive of the thickening agent type, and more specifically a bulking agent. It is also used as a stabilizer. This is an additive belonging to the family of modified starches.

This is a starch that is treated with acetic anhydride and adipic acid anhydride to resist high temperatures.

No acceptable daily intake for human consumption has been determined.

== See also ==
- Dextrin (E1400)
- Modified starch
