= Destarch =

Process when a plant is deprived of starch

Destarching occurs in a plant when a part of a plant is "deprived of starch, as by translocation".

It is also the process of eliminating starch reserves in a plant for experiments concerning photosynthesis. This is done by leaving the plant(s) in a dark place for 3 days. Due to the lack of photosynthesis in this place, stored starch is used up, thus the plant is destarched.
