= Glycemic =

Having to do with blood sugar

The glycemic response (or glycaemic response) to a food or meal is the effect that food or meal has on blood sugar (glucose) levels after consumption. It is normal for blood glucose and insulin levels to rise after eating and then return to fasting levels over a short period of time. This is particularly so after consumption of meals rich in certain carbohydrates. Glycemic management refers to the selection of foods to manage blood sugar levels.

Several tools have been developed to help quantify and communicate the effect of food on glycemic response. These include glycemic index (GI), glycemic load (GL) and glycemic glucose equivalents (GGE). A comparative glycemic response can also be determined, which compares the impact on blood glucose of one food to another based upon their total carbohydrate or total quantity.

In 1981, the idea of classifying carbohydrates according to their Glycemic Index was first published. Since then, many studies have been undertaken to determine the impact of altering the blood glucose-raising potential (glycemic challenge) of the diet on a wide range of short- and long-term health outcomes. However, evaluating the impact of a single dietary change on health is notoriously complex, and opinions on the relevance of GI, GL and GGE have been divided. There are many different ways of lowering glycemic response, GI or GL, not all of which have the same effects on health. ILSI Europe published a monograph in November 2011 titled "Food, Glycaemic Response and Health", which concluded that "it is becoming evident that modifying the glycemic response of the diet should not be seen as a stand-alone strategy but rather as an element of an overall balanced diet and lifestyle".

A low glycemic food will release glucose more slowly and steadily, which leads to lower postprandial (after meal) blood glucose readings. A high glycemic food causes a more rapid rise in blood glucose levels after meals. High glycemic foods are ideal for energy recovery after exercise or for a person experiencing hypoglycemia.

The glycemic effect of foods depends on a number of factors such as the type of starch (amylose versus amylopectin), physical entrapment of the starch molecules within the food, fat and protein content of the food and organic acids or their salts in the meal — adding vinegar, for example, will lower the glycemic response. The presence of fat or soluble dietary fiber can slow the gastric emptying rate, thus lowering the glycemic response. In general, foods with higher amounts of fiber and/or resistant starch have a lower glycemic response.

While adding fat or protein will lower the glycemic response to a meal, the relative differences remain. That is, with or without additions, there is still a higher blood glucose curve after a high glycemic white bread than after a low glycemic bread such as pumpernickel.

Unrefined wild plant foods like those available to contemporary foragers typically exhibit low glycemic indices.
