= Modified starch =

Thickening agent

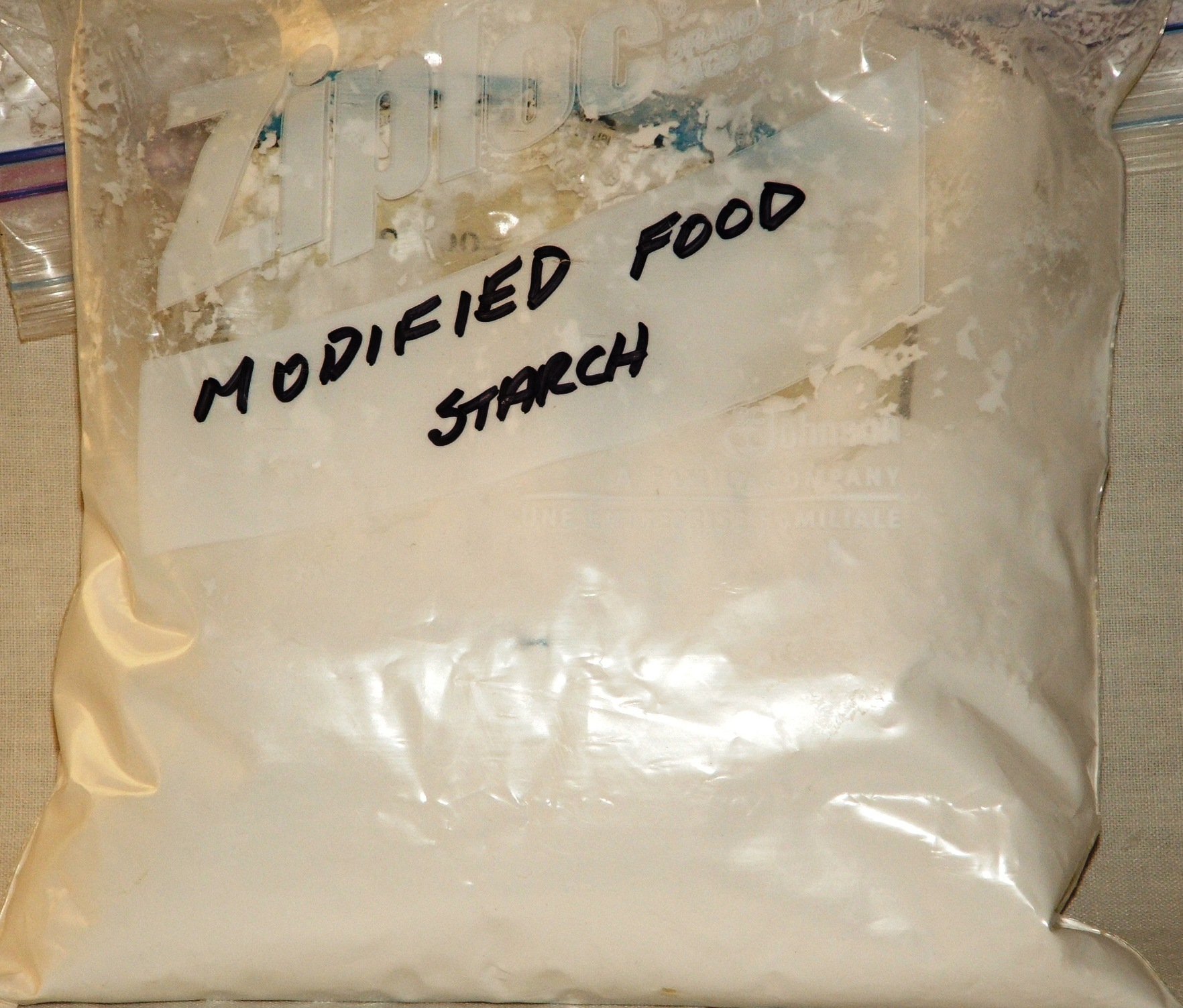
Pack of modified food starch, a food additive which is prepared by treating starch or starch granules

Modified starch, also called starch derivatives, is prepared by physically, enzymatically, or chemically treating native starch to change its properties. Modified starches are used in practically all starch applications, such as in food products as a thickening agent, stabilizer or emulsifier; in pharmaceuticals as a disintegrant; or as binder in coated paper. They are also used in many other applications.

Starches are modified to enhance their performance in different applications and are one of the components of ultra-processed foods. Starches may be modified to increase their stability against excessive heat, acid, shear, time, cooling, or freezing, to change their texture, to decrease or increase their viscosity, to lengthen or shorten gelatinization time or to increase their visco-stability.

== Modification methods ==
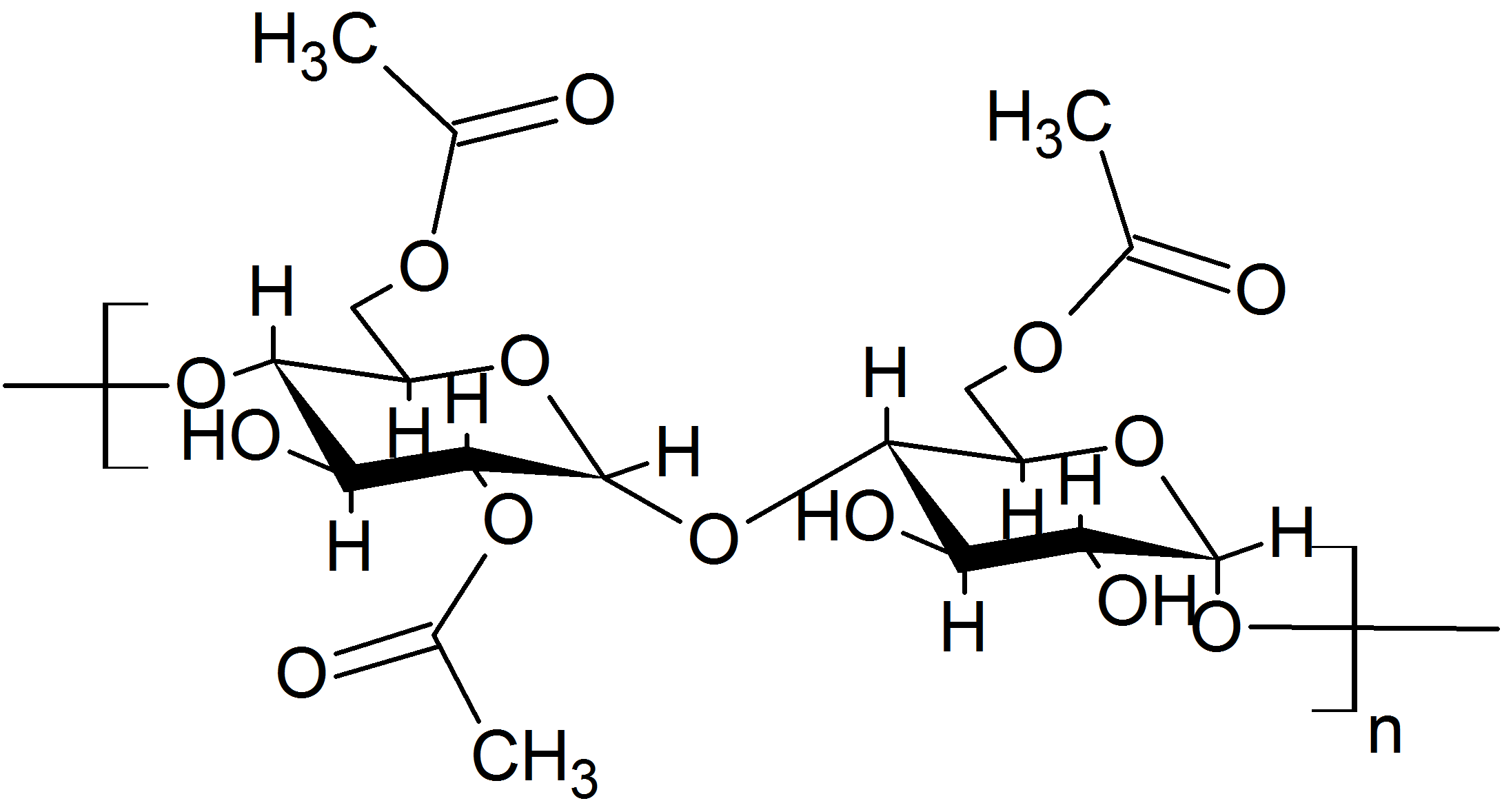
Starch acetate

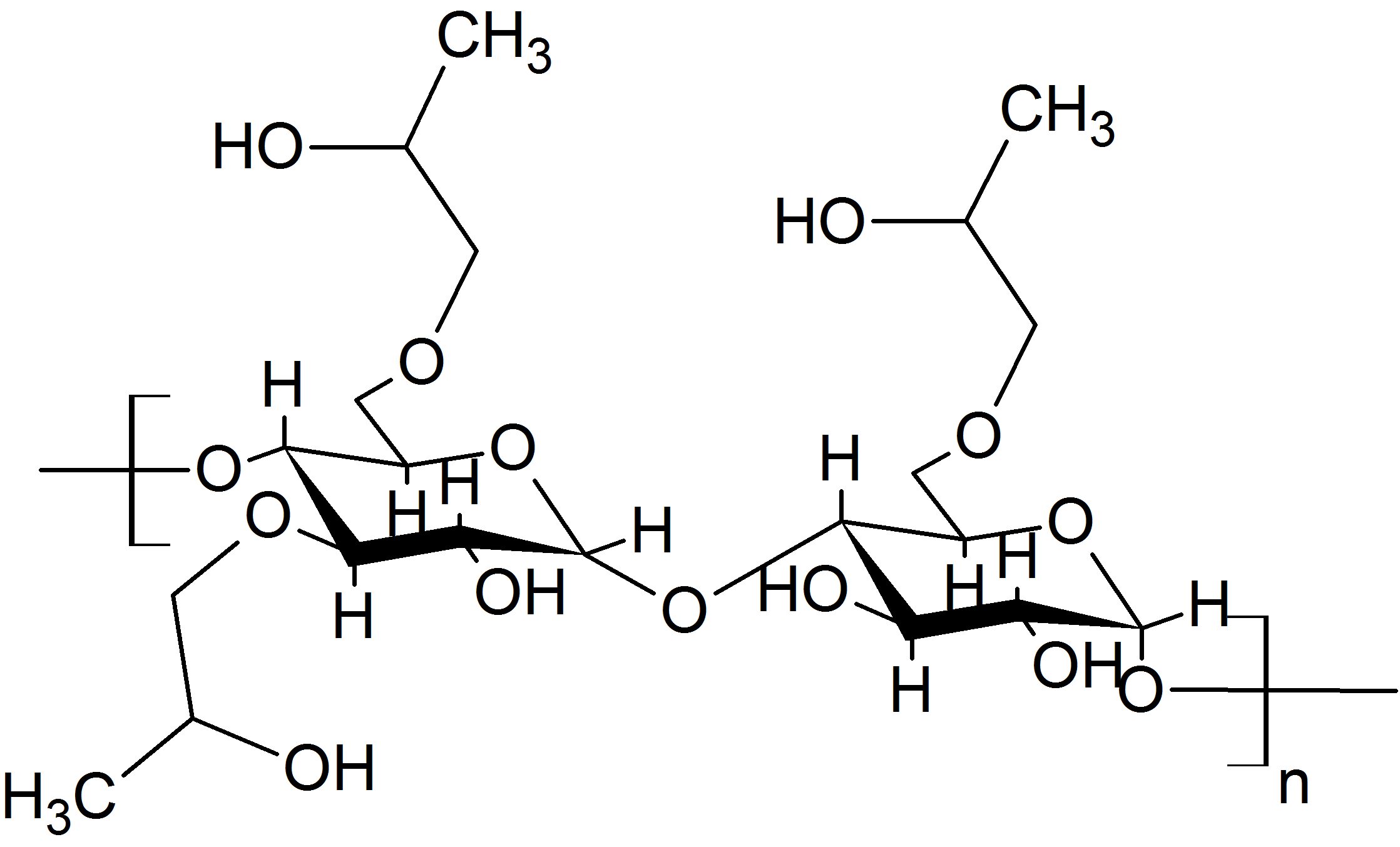
Hydroxypropylated starch

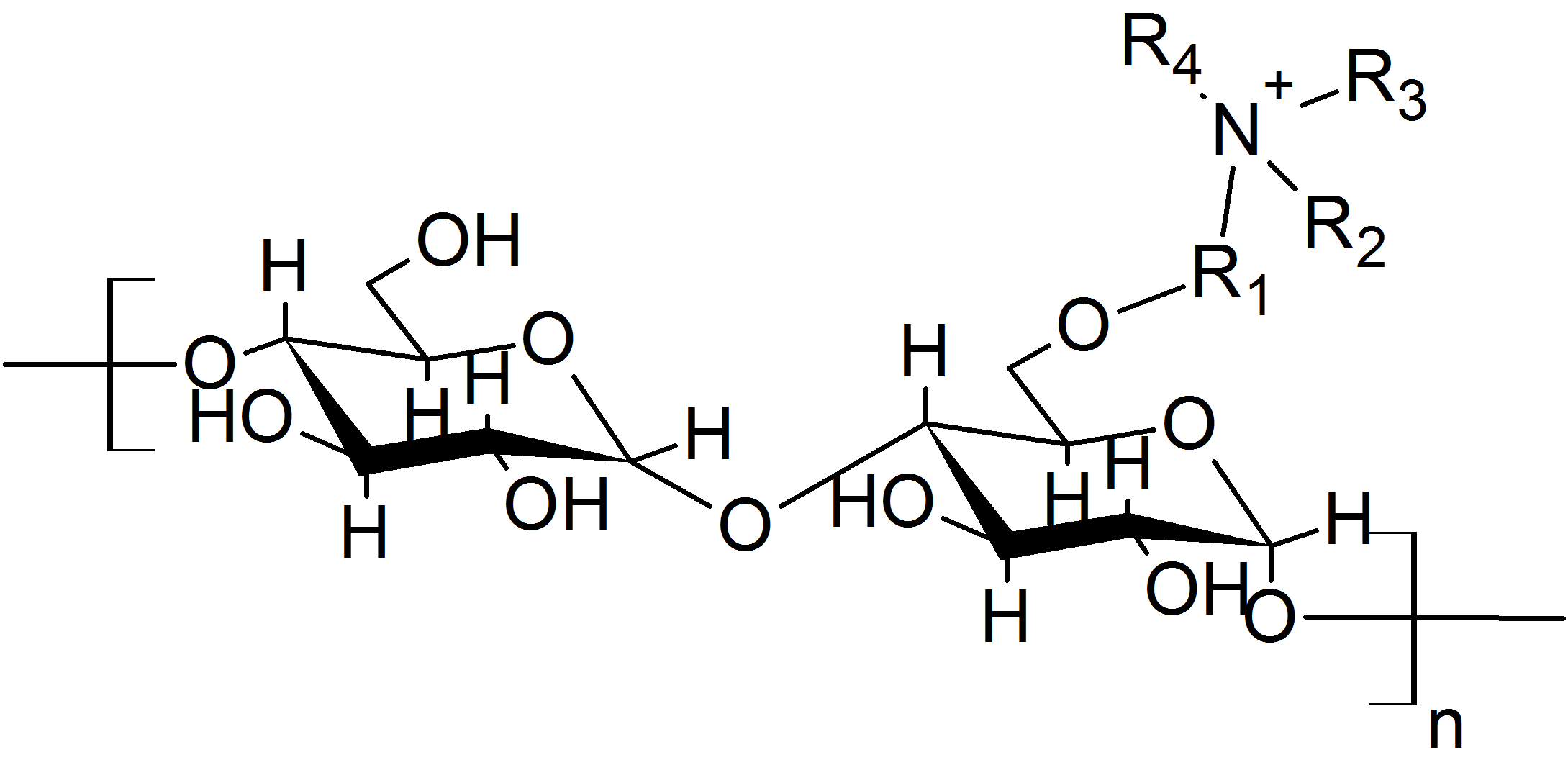
Cationic starch

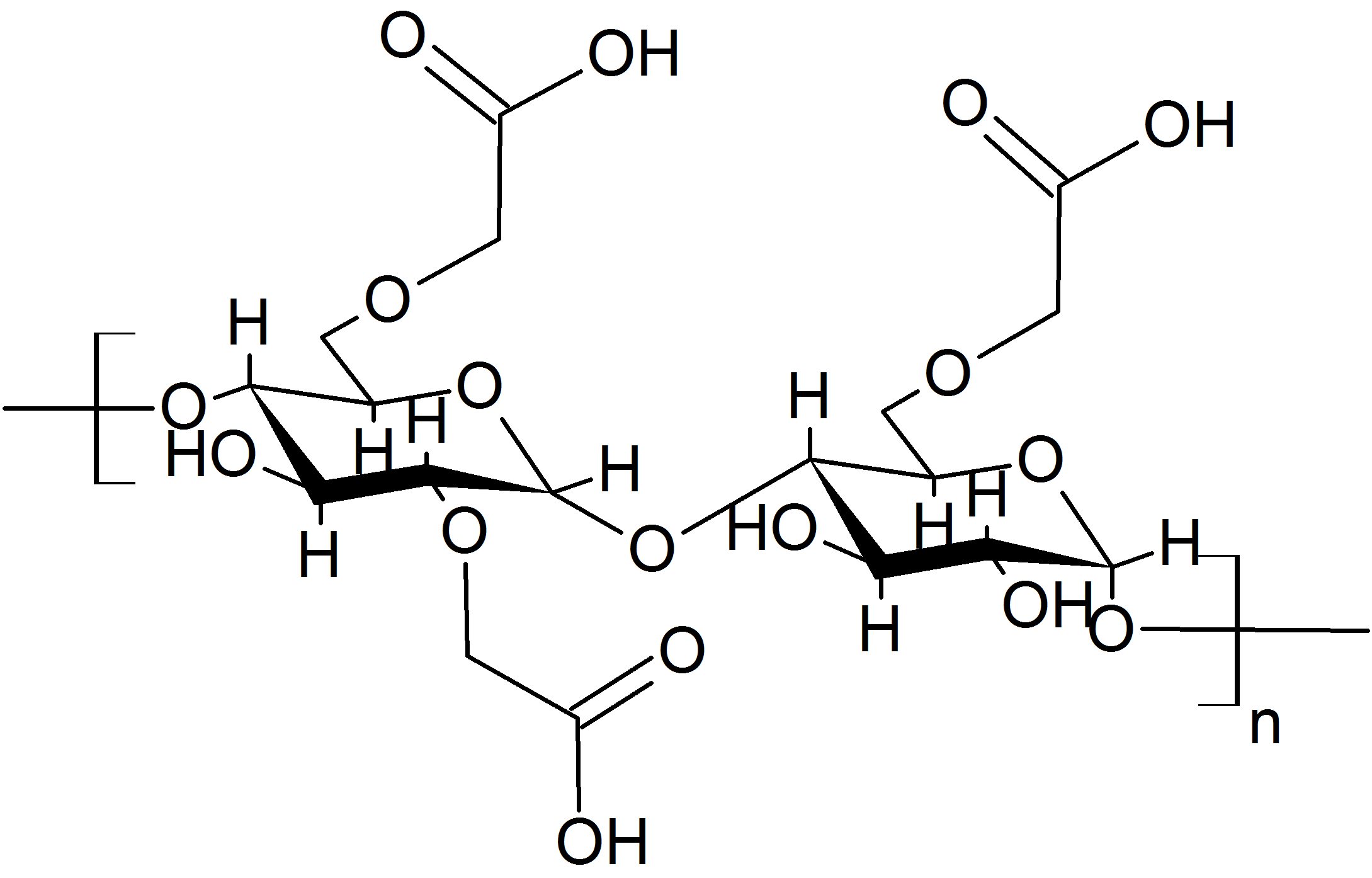
Carboxymethylated starch

An ancient way of modifying starch is malting grain, which humans have done for thousands of years. The plant's own enzymes modify the grain's starches. The effects can be modulated by varying the duration and the ambient conditions of the process. However, malting alone is not a limitless or optimized tool for every desirable end product. In recent centuries, the range of starch-modification methods has expanded through the use of simple substances such as acids, alkalis, and naturally occurring enzymes to modify starches in tailored ways.

Acid-treated starch (INS 1401), also called thin boiling starch, is prepared by treating starch or starch granules with inorganic acids, e.g. hydrochloric acid (equivalent to stomach acid), breaking down the starch molecule and thus reducing the viscosity.

Other treatments producing modified starch (with different INS and E-numbers) are:

- dextrin (INS 1400), roasted starch with hydrochloric acid
- alkaline-modified starch (INS 1402) with sodium hydroxide or potassium hydroxide
- bleached starch (INS 1403) with hydrogen peroxide
- oxidized starch (INS 1404, E1404) with sodium hypochlorite, breaking down viscosity
- enzyme-treated starch (INS 1405), maltodextrin, cyclodextrin
- monostarch phosphate (INS 1410, E1410) with phosphorous acid or the salts sodium phosphate, potassium phosphate, or sodium triphosphate to reduce retrogradation
- distarch phosphate (INS 1412, E1412) by esterification with for example sodium trimetaphosphate, crosslinked starch modifying the rheology, the texture
- acetylated starch (INS 1420, E1420) esterification with acetic anhydride
- hydroxypropylated starch (INS 1440, E1440), starch ether, with propylene oxide, increasing viscosity stability
- hydroxyethyl starch, with ethylene oxide
- starch sodium octenyl succinate (OSA) starch (INS 1450, E1450) used as emulsifier adding hydrophobicity
- starch aluminium octenyl Succinate (INS 1452, E1452)
- cationic starch, adding positive electrical charge to starch
- carboxymethylated starch with monochloroacetic acid adding negative charge

and combined modifications such as

- phosphated distarch phosphate (INS 1413, E1413)
- acetylated distarch phosphate (INS 1414, E1414)
- acetylated distarch adipate (INS 1422, E1422),
- hydroxypropyl distarch phosphate (INS 1442, E1442),
- acetylated oxidized starch (INS 1451, E1451).

Modified starch may also be a cold-water-soluble, pregelatinized or instant starch which thickens and gels without heat, or a cook-up starch which must be cooked like regular starch. Drying methods to make starches cold-water-soluble are extrusion, drum drying, spray drying or dextrinization.

Other starch derivatives, the starch sugars, like glucose, high fructose syrup, glucose syrups, maltodextrins, starch degraded with amylase enzyme are mainly sold as liquid syrup to make a sweetener.

== Examples of use and functionality of modified starch ==
Pre-gelatinized starch is used to thicken instant desserts, allowing the food to thicken with the addition of cold water or milk. Similarly, cheese sauce granules such as in macaroni and cheese, lasagna, or gravy granules may be thickened with boiling water without the product going lumpy. Commercial pizza toppings containing modified starch will thicken when heated in the oven, keeping them on top of the pizza, and then become runny when cooled.

A suitably modified starch is used as a fat substitute for low-fat versions of traditionally fatty foods, e.g. industrial milk-based desserts like yogurt or reduced-fat hard salami having about 1/3 the usual fat content. For the latter type of uses, it is an alternative to the product Olestra.

Modified starch is added to frozen products to prevent them from dripping when defrosted. Modified starch, bonded with phosphate, allows the starch to absorb more water and keeps the ingredients together. Modified starch acts as an emulsifier for French dressing by enveloping oil droplets and suspending them in the water. Acid-treated starch forms the shell of jelly beans. Oxidized starch increases the stickiness of batter.

Carboxymethylated starches are used as a wallpaper adhesive, as textile printing thickener, as tablet disintegrants and excipients in the pharmaceutical industry.

Cationic starch is used as wet end sizing agent in paper manufacturing.

== Genetically modified starch ==
Modified starch should not be confused with genetically modified starch, which refers to starch from genetically engineered plants, such as those that have been genetically modified to produce novel fatty acids or carbohydrates which might not occur in the plant species being harvested. In Europe the term "Genetically Modified Organism" is used solely where "the genetic material has been altered in a way that does not occur naturally through fertilisation and/or natural recombination". The modification in "genetically modified" refers to the genetic engineering of the plant DNA, whereas in the term "Modified Starch" seen on mandatory ingredient labels it refers to the later processing or treatment of the starch or starch granules.

Genetically modified starch is of interest in the manufacture of biodegradable polymers and noncellulose feedstock in the paper industry, as well as the creation of new food additives. For example, researchers aim to alter the enzymes within living plants to create starches with desirable modified properties, and thus eliminate the need for enzymatic processing after starch is extracted from the plant.

== See also ==
- Acceptable daily intake – Measure of a substance in food or water
- Retrogradation (starch) – Gelatinization of starch
- Starch gelatinization – Process of breaking down the intermolecular bonds of starch by water
- Resistant starch – Dietary fiber

== Suggested reading ==
- Ridgwell, Jenny (2001). GCSE food technology for OCR (2nd ed.). Oxford: Heinemann. ISBN 978-0-435-41951-6.
- Winson, Alison (2003). Revise for OCR GCSE Food Technology. Heinemann. ISBN 978-0-435-41715-4.
- Albertsson, Ann-Christine; Huang, Samuel J., eds. (1995). Degradable Polymers, Recycling, and Plastics Waste Management. doi:10.1201/9780585400013. ISBN 978-0-429-07373-1.
- Ridgwell, Jenny (2001). Modified Starch: Resource Book. Ridgwell Press. ISBN 978-1-901151-07-7.
