= Resistant starch =

Dietary fiber

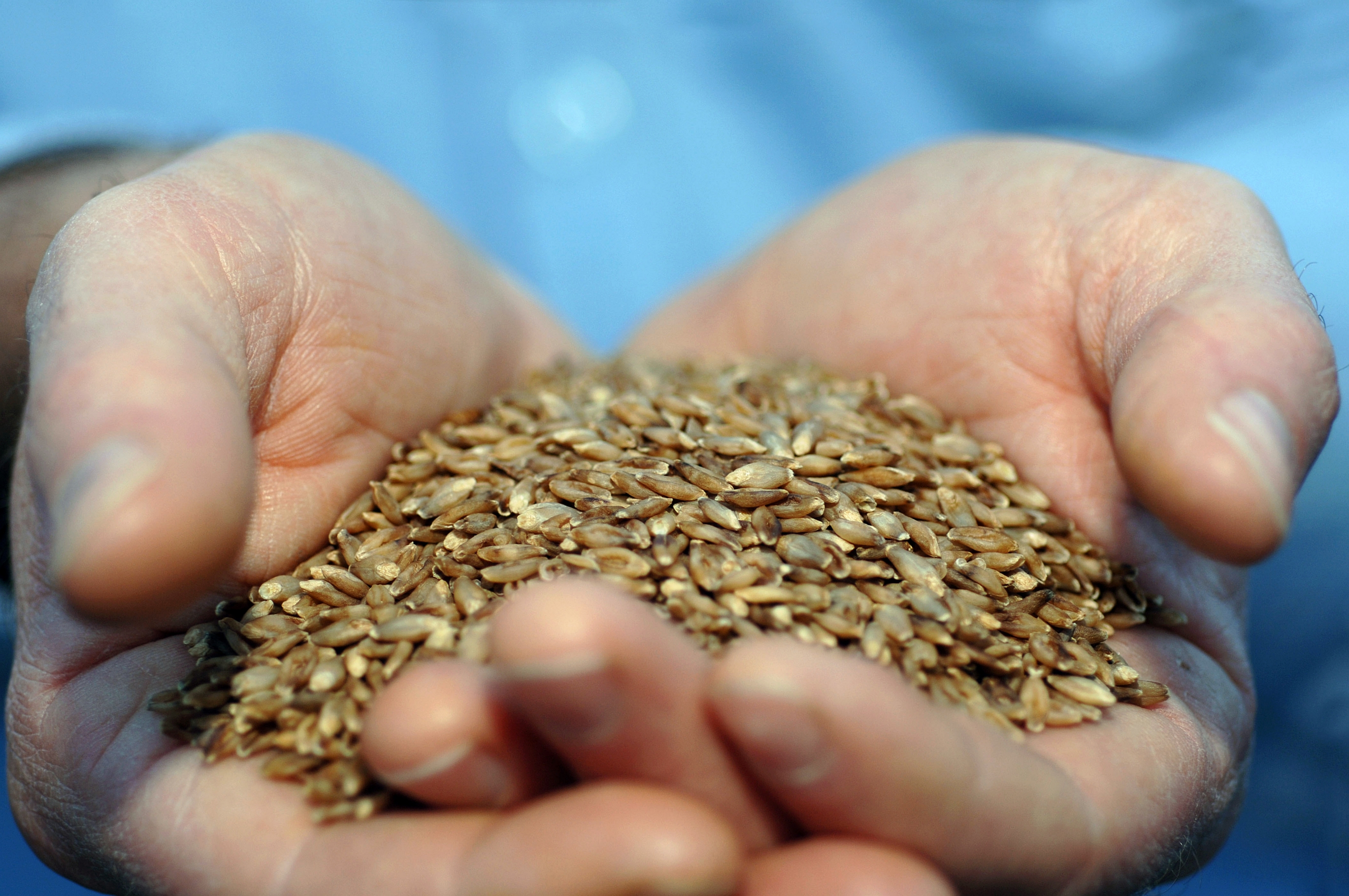
A specially developed strain of barley, high in resistant starch

Resistant starch (RS) is starch, including its degradation products, that escapes (resists) digestion in the small intestine of healthy individuals. Resistant starch occurs naturally in foods, and can be used as an additive in manufactured foods. It is one of three starch types, along with rapidly digested starch and slowly digested starch. All three may affect levels of blood glucose.

Some types of resistant starch (RS1, RS2, and RS3) are fermented by the large intestinal microbiota, producing short-chain fatty acids, increased bacterial mass, and promotion of butyrate-producing bacteria. Resistant starch has physiological effects similar to dietary fiber, behaving as a mild laxative and possibly causing flatulence.

== Origin and history of the concept ==
The concept of resistant starch arose in the 1970s from research supported by the European Commission.

== Health effects ==
Resistant starch does not release glucose within the small intestine but, rather, reaches the large intestine, where it is consumed or fermented by colonic bacteria (gut microbiota). On a daily basis, human intestinal microbiota encounter more carbohydrates than any other dietary component. This includes resistant starch, non-starch polysaccharide fibers, oligosaccharides, and simple sugars, which have significance in colon health.

The fermentation of resistant starch produces short-chain fatty acids, including acetate, propionate, and butyrate, promoting increased bacterial cell mass. The short-chain fatty acids are produced in the large intestine where they are rapidly absorbed from the colon, then are metabolized in colonic epithelial cells, liver or other tissues. The fermentation of resistant starch produces more butyrate than other types of dietary fibers.

Studies have shown that resistant starch supplementation was well tolerated. Modest amounts of gases, such as carbon dioxide, methane, and hydrogen, are also produced in intestinal fermentation.

One review estimated that the acceptable daily intake of resistant starch may be as high as 45 grams in adults, an amount exceeding the total recommended intake for dietary fiber of 25–38 grams per day. When isolated resistant starch is used to substitute for flour in foods, the glycemic response of that food is reduced.

There is limited evidence that RS2 and RS3 resistant starch can improve fasting glucose, fasting insulin, insulin resistance and sensitivity, especially in individuals who are diabetic, overweight or obese. In 2016, the U.S. FDA approved a qualified health claim stating that resistant starch might reduce the risk of type 2 diabetes, but with qualifying language for product labels that limited scientific evidence exists to support this claim. Because qualified health claims are issued when the science evidence is weak or not consistent, the FDA requires specific labeling language, such as the guideline concerning resistant starch: "High-amylose maize resistant starch may reduce the risk of Type 2 diabetes. FDA has concluded that there is limited scientific evidence for this claim."

Natural types of resistant starch (RS2 and RS3) may reduce appetite, especially with doses of 25 grams or more, and may reduce low-density cholesterol. Natural resistant starches are under preliminary research for their possible effects on inflammatory biomarkers, including interleukin-6, tumor necrosis factor alpha, and C-reactive protein.

Chemically modified resistant starches, (RS4), have been shown to reduce glycemic response in foods, but the fermentation-related effects have not yet been determined, as their fermentation-related pathways often differ compared to natural types of resistant starch.

== Starch structure ==
Plants store starch in tightly packed granules, consisting of layers of amylose and amylopectin. The size and shape of the starch granule varies by botanical source. For instance, the average size of potato starch is approximately 38 micrometers, wheat starch an average of 22 micrometers and rice starch approximately 8 micrometers.

Starch granule characteristics
Starch	Diameter, microns (micrometers)	Granule Shape	Gelatinization temp, °C
Maize / corn	5-30	Round, Polygonal	62–72
Waxy maize	5-30	Round, Polygonal	63–72
Tapioca	4-35	Oval, Truncated	62–73
Potato	5-100	Oval, Spherical	59–68
Wheat	1-45	Round, Lenticular	58–64
Rice	3-8	Polygonal, Spherical; Compound granules	68–78
High amylose maize	5-30	Polygonal, Irregular; Elongated	63-92 (not gelatinized in boiling water)

Raw starch granules resist digestion, e.g., raw bananas, raw potatoes. This does not depend on the amylose or amylopectin content, but rather the structure of the granule protecting the starch.

When starch granules are cooked, water is absorbed into the granule causing swelling and increased size. In addition, amylose chains can leak out as the granule swells. The viscosity of the solution increases as the temperature is increased. The gelatinization temperature is defined as the temperature at which maximum gelatinization or swelling of the starch granule has occurred. This is also the point of maximum viscosity. Further cooking will burst the granule apart completely, releasing all of the glucose chains. In addition, viscosity is reduced as the granules are destroyed. The glucose chains can reassociate into short crystalline structures, which typically involves rapid recrystallization of amylose molecules followed by a slow recrystallization of amylopectin molecules in a process called retrogradation.

Plants produce starch with different types of structure and shape characteristics which may affect digestion. For instance, smaller starch granules are more available to enzyme digestion because the larger percentage of surface area increases the enzyme binding rate.

Starch consists of amylose and amylopectin which affect the textural properties of manufactured foods. Cooked starches with high amylose content generally have increased resistant starch.

== Definition and categorization ==
Resistant starch (RS) is any starch or starch digestion products that are not digested and absorbed in the stomach or small intestine and pass on to the large intestine. RS has been categorized into five types:

- RS1 – Physically inaccessible or undigestible resistant starch, such as that found in seeds or legumes and unprocessed whole grains. This starch is bound within the fibrous cell walls of the aforementioned foods.
- RS2 – Resistant starch that has a unique crystalline covering making it inaccessible to enzymes, as occurs in the starch of green bananas, raw potatoes, and high-amylose corn starch.
- RS3 – Resistant starch that is formed when starch-containing foods (e.g., rice, potatoes, pasta) are cooked and cooled. This occurs due to retrogradation, which is starch becoming less soluble, after being heated and dissolved in water and then cooled.
- RS4 – Includes two types:
  - Starches that have been chemically modified to resist digestion, such as phosphated distarch phosphate RS4 starches that have been approved as a type of dietary fiber on food labels in the United States. Starches have also been esterified to add short-chain fatty acids such as butyrate. RS4 starches may include functional groups added, producing carboxymethyl starch, starch ester, or cross-linked starch.
  - Indigestible dextrins and maltodextrins are starch degradation products that have been hydrolyzed into low-molecular-weight compounds that cannot be digested by human digestive enzymes. These soluble ingredients can be prebiotic dietary fiber.
- RS5 – Starches that are complexed with lipids, typically forming a helical (V1) or lamellar (V2) structure that cannot be penetrated by amylase or water. In a broader view, RS5 starches have self-assembled with any other molecule to form V1 or V2 structures.

== Processing effects ==
Processing may affect the natural resistant starch content of foods. In general, processes that break down structural barriers to digestion reduce resistant starch content, with greater reductions resulting from processing. Whole grain wheat may contain as high as 14% resistant starch, while milled wheat flour may contain only 2%. Resistant starch content of cooked rice was found to decrease due to grinding; resistant starch content of oats dropped from 16 to 3% during cooking.

Other types of processing increase resistant starch content. If cooking includes excess water, the starch is gelatinized and becomes more digestible. However, if these starch gels are then cooled, they can form starch crystals resistant to digestive enzymes (type RS3 or retrograded resistant starch), as in cooked and cooled cereals and potatoes (e.g., potato salad). Cooling boiled potatoes overnight at 4 °C (39 °F) was found to increase the amount of resistant starch by a factor of 2.8.

High amylose varieties of corn, wheat, barley, potato and rice have been naturally bred to increase the resistant starch content that will survive baking and mild extrusion processing, which enables the delivery of resistant starch in processed foods.

== Nutritional information ==
Resistant starch is considered both a dietary fiber and a functional fiber, depending on whether it is naturally in foods or added. Although the U.S. Institute of Medicine has defined total fiber as equal to functional fiber plus dietary fiber, U.S. food labeling does not distinguish between them.

Examples of naturally occurring resistant starch
Food	Serving size (1 cup is ≈ 237 ml)	Resistant starch (grams)	grams per 100 grams (%)
Banana flour, from green bananas	1 cup, uncooked	42–52.8	~20.9 (dry)
Banana, raw, slightly green	1 medium, peeled	4.7	
High amylose RS2 corn resistant starch	1 tablespoon (9.5 g)	4.5	47.4 (dry)
High amylose RS2 wheat resistant starch	1/4 cup (30 g)	5.0	16.7
Oats, rolled	1 cup, uncooked (81.08 g)	17.6	21.7 (dry)
Green peas, frozen	1 cup, cooked (160 g)	4.0	2.5
White beans	1 cup, cooked (179 g)	7.4	4.1
Lentils	1 cup cooked (198 g)	5.0	2.5
Cold pasta	1 cup (160g)	1.9	1.2
Pearl barley	1 cup cooked (157 g)	3.2	2.03
Cold potato	1/2" diameter	0.6 – 0.8	
Oatmeal	1 cup cooked (234 g)	0.5	0.2

The Institute of Medicine Panel on the Definition of Dietary Fiber proposed two definitions: functional fiber as "isolated, nondigestible carbohydrates that have beneficial physiological effects in humans", and dietary fiber as "nondigestible carbohydrates and lignin that are intrinsic and intact in plants." They also proposed that the prior classifications of soluble versus insoluble be phased out and replaced with viscous versus fermentable for each specific fiber.

== Uses ==
=== In food ===
The average resistant starch intake in developed countries ranges from 3–6 grams/day for Northern Europeans, Australians and Americans, 8.5 grams/day for Italians and 10–15 grams/day in Indian and Chinese diets. The higher consumption of starch-containing foods like pasta and rice likely accounts for higher intake of resistant starch in Italy, India and China.

Several studies have found that the traditional African diet is high in resistant starch. Rural black South Africans consume an average of 38 grams of resistant starch per day by having cooked and cooled corn porridge and beans in their diets.

RS2 resistant starch from high amylose wheat and high amylose corn can be baked into foods, usually replacing flour or other high glycemic carbohydrates.

=== In fortified products ===
In 2011, the European Commission authorized a health claim for use of resistant starch in manufactured foods, stating that "replacing digestible starches with resistant starch in a meal contributes to a reduction in the blood glucose rise after that meal". The claim applies only for foods in which digestible starch has been replaced by resistant starch for at least 14% of the total starch in the product.

Isolated and extracted resistant starch and foods rich in resistant starch have been used to fortify foods to increase their dietary fiber content. Typically, food fortification uses RS2 resistant starch from high amylose corn or high amylose wheat, RS3 resistant starch from cassava, and RS4 resistant starch from wheat and potato, as these sources can survive varying degrees of food processing without losing their resistant starch content.

Resistant starch has a small particle size, white appearance, bland flavor and low water-holding capacity. Resistant starch typically replaces flour in foods, such as bread and other baked goods, pasta, cereal and batters because it can produce foods with similar color and texture to the original food. It has also been used for its textural properties in imitation cheese.

Some types of resistant starch are used as dietary supplements in the United States. RS2 from potato starch and green banana starch maintains its resistance to digestion as long as the food is consumed raw and unheated. If such foods are heated or baked, RS2 starch becomes digestible.
