= Global Wind Day =

Event organized by WindEurope

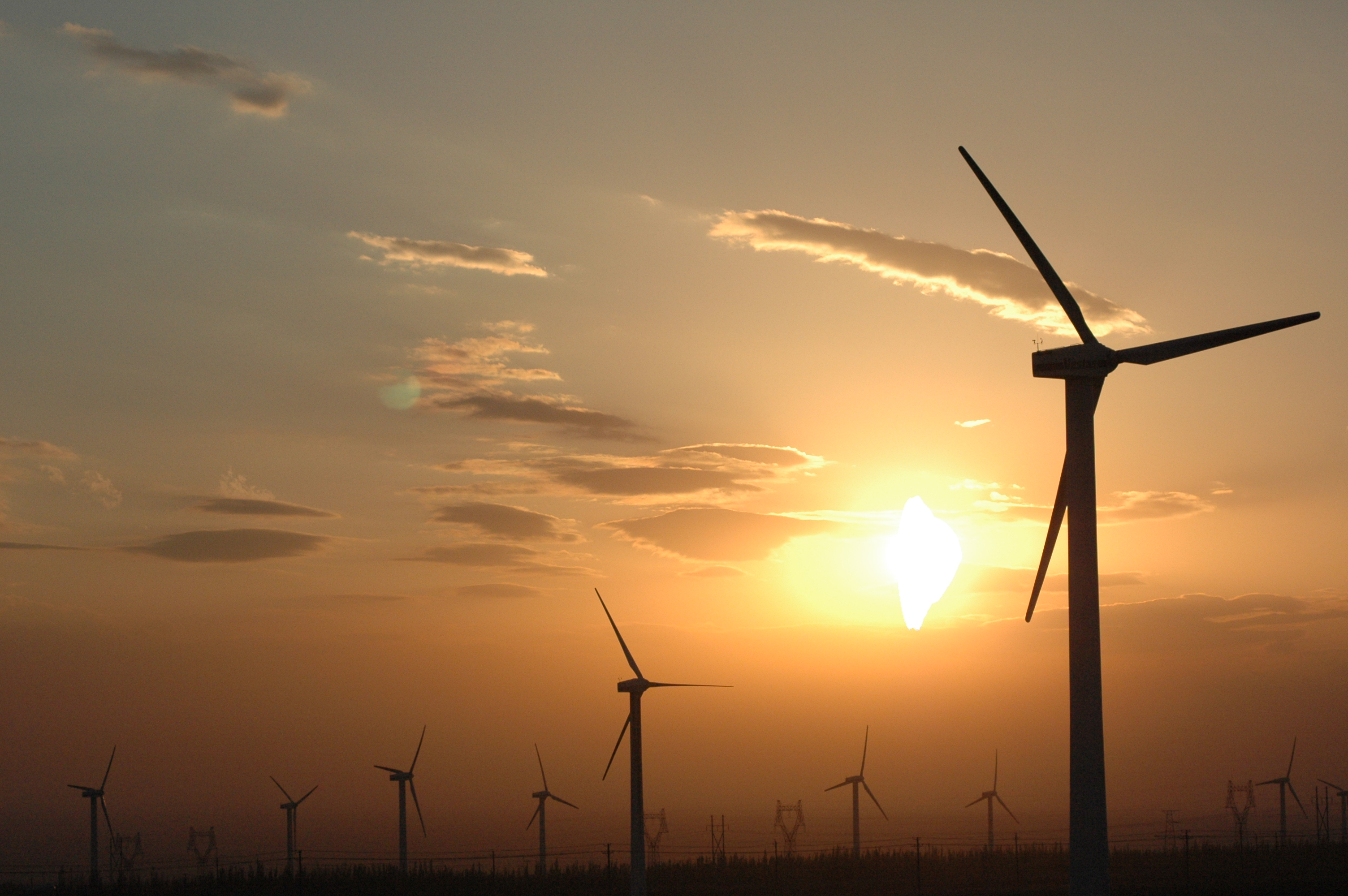
- Also called: World Wind Day
- Observed by: All UN Member States, People around the world
- Date: 15 June
- Next time: 15 June 2027
- Duration: 5 day
- Frequency: annual
- First time: June 15, 1967; 59 years ago

Global Wind Day or World Wind Day is a worldwide event that is held on June 15. It is organised by WindEurope and GWEC (Global Wind Energy Council). It is a day when wind energy is celebrated, information is exchanged and adults and children find out about wind energy, its power and the possibilities it holds to change the world.

In association with EWEA and GWEC, national wind energy associations and companies involved in wind energy production organise events in many countries around the world. In 2011, there were events organised in 30 countries, on 4 continents. Events included visits to onshore and offshore wind farms, information campaigns, demonstration turbines being set up in cities, wind workshops and a wind parade. Many events happened on Global Wind Day (15 June) itself, but there were also events on the days and weeks before and afterwards. In 2012 there were 250 events around the globe and a popular photo competition.

== 2007 ==
The inaugural year of Wind Day (it did not become Global Wind Day until 2009) was organised by EWEA. The main idea was to coordinate events organised by national wind energy associations and companies active in the wind energy field. Wind Day in 2007 reached 18 countries in Europe, with a participation of around 35,000 people.

== 2008 ==
Wind Day 2008 reached 20 European countries and attracted 100,000 people.

== 2009 ==
This was the first year that EWEA joined forces with GWEC and extended the reach from European wind energy associations and companies to coordinate Wind Day events across the globe (and changing the name to Global Wind Day). In 2009 there were 300 events in 35 countries, reaching 1 million people.

In Portugal, Wind Day 2009 was celebrated with an event called Wind Parade. It was organised in the city of Cascais, in front of the ocean. This project aimed to promote renewable energy good practices and in particular Wind Energy. It was supported by the City Council and conceived by Energia Lateral and implied the installation of 7 micro wind turbines in a visible place by the sea in June–July 9. One of the purposes was to involve children and they were invited for a contest to decorate/paint small dummy wind turbines. Over 50 applications were submitted by 30 schools. The winner decorated a dummy wind turbine with Don Quixote elements comparing his fight against the windmills but in this case the wind mills being allies of Don Quixote in an epic effort to improve the environment.

== 2010 ==
In this year, 220 events took place in 30 countries, including the display of a 29.5 metre (96.7 ft) wind turbine blade in Brussels, Belgium, next to the main building of the European Commission and European Council. More than 1 million people were reached by Global Wind Day communications around the world.

== 2011 ==
In Brussels, Belgium, the home of EWEA and GWEC, a wind parade in Place de Luxembourg educated people working in the EU area on the benefits and importance of wind energy.

Global Wind Day events happened in 30 countries around the world in 2011. Some examples include: In France there were 15 events, ranging from wind farm inauguration to a jobs-in-the-wind-industry question and answer session. In Austria, journalists leapt from the top of a turbine and abseiled to the ground. In Japan there were 10 events, involving field trips to wind farms, experimental wind energy facilities and making wind turbines from a kit. In Australia, an open day at a wind farm was available, with a community evening to finish off the day. In Mexico, a public street fair featured a drawing competition for kids and a display of wind energy history.

== 2012 ==
Global Wind Day partners organised 250 events around the globe in 2012, from wind farm open days to workshops, from photo exhibition to regattas, from kite-flying to charity runs. For the first time, this included events in Mexico, Chile, Israel, South Korea and South Africa. Global Wind Day 2012 gained the support of 18 GWD Ambassadors, who were joined by the Danish Presidency of the EU and the United Nations. Kandeh K. Yumkella, the Director-General of the United Nations Industrial Development Organization (UNIDO), and the leader of Secretary General Ban Ki-moon’s Sustainable Energy for All initiative said, ‘We need to double the share of renewable energy in the global energy mix by 2030. This can be achieved with significant contribution from wind energy, both grid connected and for small-scale decentralised systems. The ‘Global Wind Day’ on 15 June, does play a central role in contributing to the UNSG’s Sustainable Energy For All initiative through galvanising the much needed support for the wind energy industry from political leaders around the globe’. The ‘Wind in Mind’ photo competition saw 2,300 photos from over 40 countries submitted.

== 2018 ==
For 2018, WindEurope and GWEC launched a global photo competition to capture the power of wind in the run up to Global Wind Day.

== 2019 ==
For 2019, WindEurope and GWEC launched the international photo competition "Future Wind" in the run up to Global Wind Day. The competition received over 600 photos from more than 50 countries.

== 2023 ==
For 2023 WindEurope and GWEC organised the "Old turbines new furniture" exhibition showcasing innovative designer furniture made from old wind turbine parts.
