= Set-off (printing) =

In printing, set-off is the term given to the unwanted transfer of ink from one printed sheet to another. The problem can occur with most types of printing, and is avoided by the use of slipsheets between copies (so any ink transfer occurs onto discardable paper) or anti-set-off spray powder.

The term in offset printing also refers to the unwanted transfer of ink to rollers and friction points throughout the printing press. Ink that is not properly dried or set can build up over time and cause marking on the finished product.

Additionally, some offset printing applications add moisture back into the paper template after an offset heat set dryer. Water that does not have enough hardness will break down the calcium carbonate in the paper and cause build-up or set-off on later components of the press.

== See also ==
- lithography
- offset printing
- letterpress printing
- printmaking
- printing press
- color printing - Colour Printing
- MAN Roland
- Koenig & Bauer - KBA
- Komori
- Heidelberger Druckmaschinen - Heidelberg
- See also Printing
