= Distarch phosphate =

Names
- Other names: Phosphate cross-linked starch; Starch, hydrogen phosphate

Identifiers
CAS Number	55963-33-2
ECHA InfoCard	100.109.433
E number	E1412 (additional chemicals)
CompTox Dashboard (EPA)	DTXSID101009769
- Except where otherwise noted, data are given for materials in their standard state (at 25 °C [77 °F], 100 kPa). Infobox references

Distarch phosphate, E1412 in the E number scheme of food additives, is a modified starch. These are not absorbed intact by the gut, but are significantly hydrolysed by intestinal enzymes and then fermented by intestinal microbiota.
