= Acetylated starch =

Names
- Other names: Starch acetate

Identifiers
CAS Number	9045-28-7
ECHA InfoCard	100.110.420
EC Number	618-556-3
E number	E1420 (additional chemicals)
CompTox Dashboard (EPA)	DTXSID40920379
- Except where otherwise noted, data are given for materials in their standard state (at 25 °C [77 °F], 100 kPa). Infobox references

Acetylated starch, E1420 in the E number scheme of food additives, is a modified starch. These are not absorbed intact by the gut, but are significantly hydrolysed by intestinal enzymes and then fermented by intestinal microbiota.
