= Hydroxypropyl starch =

Names
- Other names: Hydroxyl propyl starch; 2-Hydroxypropyl starch; Hydroxylpropyl starch

Identifiers
CAS Number	9049-76-7
ECHA InfoCard	100.118.745
E number	E1440 (additional chemicals)
UNII	9M44R3409A
CompTox Dashboard (EPA)	DTXSID00891995
- Except where otherwise noted, data are given for materials in their standard state (at 25 °C [77 °F], 100 kPa). Infobox references

Hydroxypropyl starch is a type of modified starch used as a food additive. It has the E number E1440. Hydroxyl propyl starch is not absorbed intact by the gut, but are significantly hydrolyzed by intestinal enzymes and then fermented by intestinal microbiota.
