= Wallpaper paste =

Adhesive material

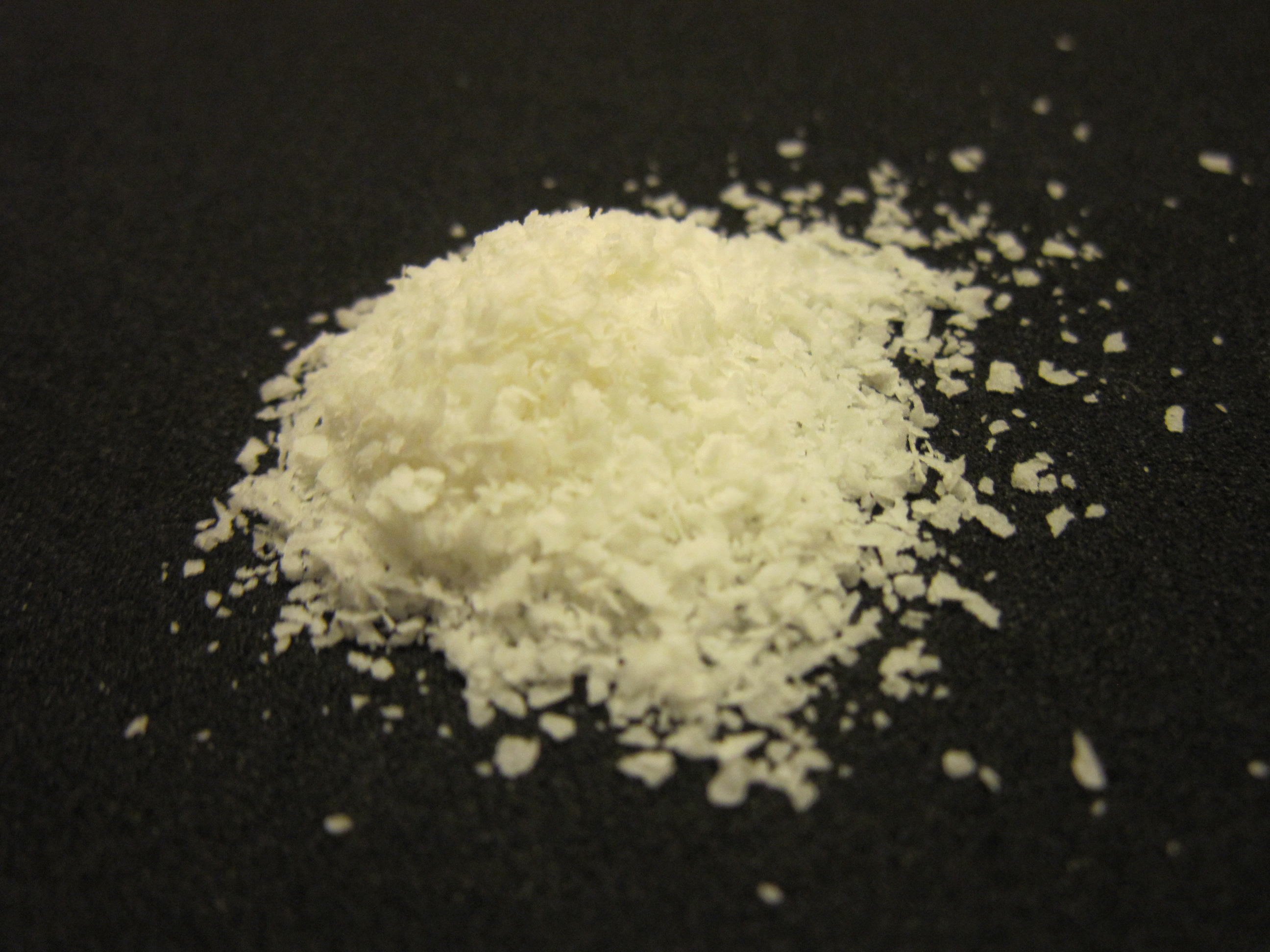
Adhesive flakes that are mixed with water to produce wallpaper paste

Wallpaper adhesive or wallpaper paste is a specific adhesive, based on modified starch, methylcellulose, or clay which is used to fix wallpaper to walls.

Wallpaper pastes have a typical shear thinning viscosity and a high wet adhesive tack. These properties are needed to slow down the penetration of the adhesive into the paper and wall, and give slow bonding speed which gives the wallpaper hanger time to line up the wallpaper correctly on the wall. The adhesive is usually sold in pouches or boxes as flakes that are mixed with water to produce the paste. It is also available ready mixed in tubs.

The wallpaper adhesive is applied to the wallpaper to let the moisture of the adhesive soak into and penetrate the paper. The paper will thus expand before hanging rather than on the wall, which would cause vertical bubbles in each panel of wallpaper as the adhesive dried from the edges in. When using a type of wallpaper paper that does not expand, such as nonwoven or fiberglass wallpaper, the adhesive is applied to the wall instead.

== See also ==
- Adhesive
- Mural
- Papercrete
- Papier-mâché
- Wallpaper
- Wheatpaste
