= Alpha-glucan, water dikinase =

alpha-glucan, water dikinase

Identifiers
- EC no.: 2.7.9.4
- CAS no.: 664327-94-0

Databases
- IntEnz: IntEnz view
- BRENDA: BRENDA entry
- ExPASy: NiceZyme view
- KEGG: KEGG entry
- MetaCyc: metabolic pathway
- PRIAM: profile
- PDB structures: RCSB PDB PDBe PDBsum
- Gene Ontology: AmiGO / QuickGO
Search
- PMC: articles
- PubMed: articles
- NCBI: proteins

In enzymology, an alpha-glucan, water dikinase (EC 2.7.9.4) is an enzyme that catalyzes the chemical reaction

ATP + alpha-glucan + H_{2}O $\rightleftharpoons$ AMP + phospho-alpha-glucan + phosphate

The 3 substrates of this enzyme are ATP, alpha-glucan, and H_{2}O, whereas its 3 products are AMP, phospho-alpha-glucan, and phosphate.

This enzyme belongs to the family of transferases, specifically those transferring phosphorus-containing groups (phosphotransferases) with paired acceptors (dikinases). The systematic name of this enzyme class is ATP:alpha-glucan, water phosphotransferase. This enzyme is also called starch-related R1 protein, GWD.
