= Retrogradation =

Movement of the front of a river delta inland over time

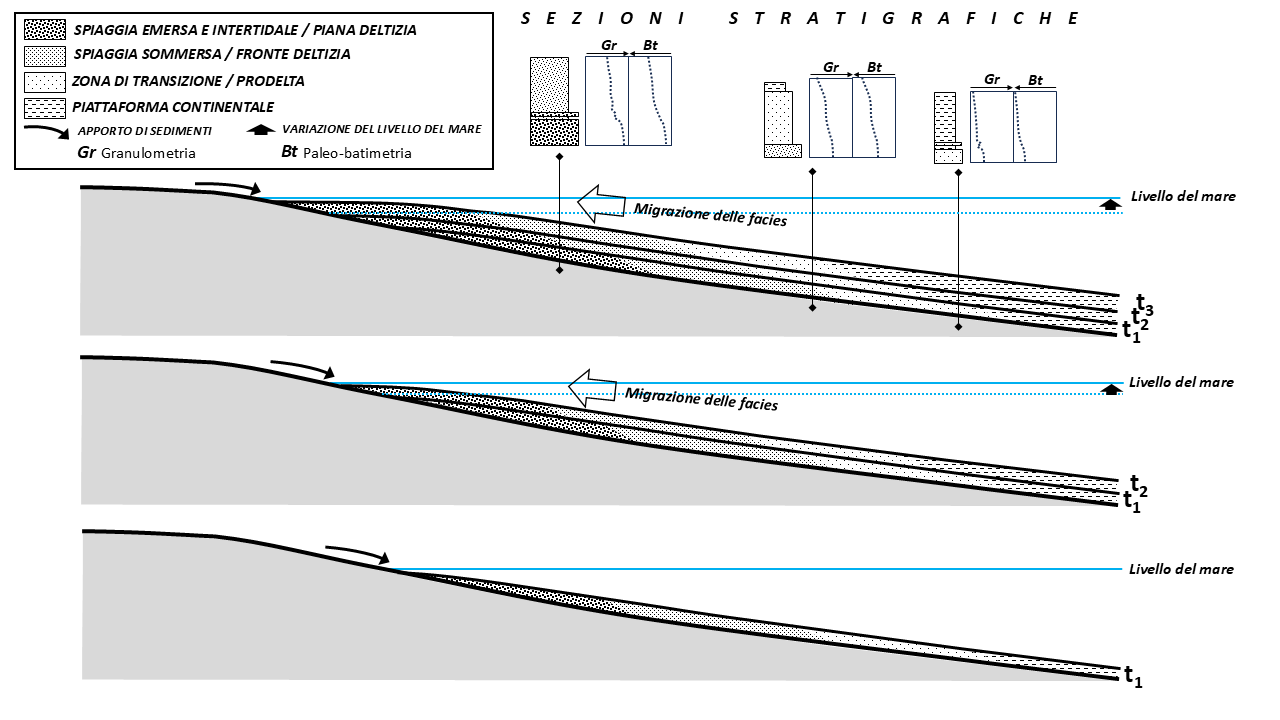
Scheme describing a retrogradation depositional pattern of coastal (shore or deltaic) sediments: t1-2-3 are consecutive sedimentation times. Ideal lithostratigraphic sections along the depositional system are reported.

Retrogradation is the landward change in position of the front of a coastal depositional system (such as a river delta) with time. This occurs when the mass balance of sediment into a delta or a beach system is such that the volume of incoming sediment is less than the volume of the delta that is lost through subsidence, sea-level rise, and/or erosion. As a result, retrogradation is most common:

- during periods of sea-level rise which results in marine transgression. This can occur during major periods of global warming and the melting of continental ice sheets.
- with extremely low sediment input.

Retrogradation may occur also in carbonate platforms during phases of sea-level rise, when the increment exceeds carbonate inputs from the biological community. In such case there is a landward shift of the reef facies onto preceding back-reef or lagoonal facies, while fore-reef or even basinal facies develop above the preceding reef system.

== See also ==
- Progradation – Growth of a river delta into the sea over time
- River delta – Silt deposition landform at the mouth of a river
- Aggradation – Increase in land elevation due to the deposition of sediment
- Marine transgression – Geologic event in which sea level rises relative to the land
- Marine regression – Geologic event in which sea level falls relative to the land
- Sedimentology – Study of natural sediments and their formation processes
- Stratigraphy – Study of rock layers and their formation
- Sequence stratigraphy – Study and analysis of groups of sedimentary deposits
- Sediment transport – Movement of solid particles, typically by gravity and fluid entrainment
