= Amflora =

Variety of potato

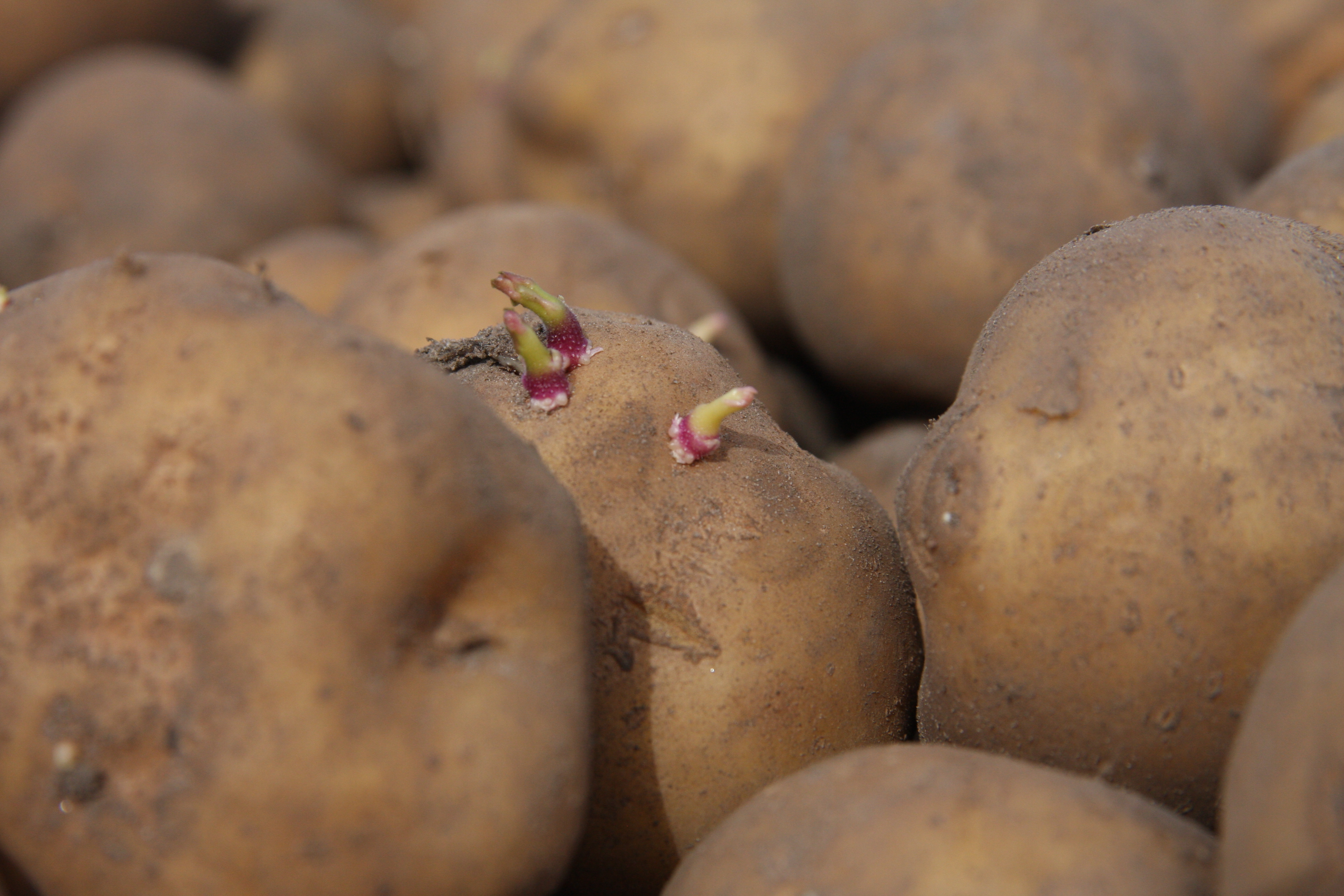
- Event: EH92-527-1
- Identifier(s): BPS-25271-9
- Plant: Solanum tuberosum L.
- Mode: Transgenesis
- Method: Insertion
- Vector: pHoxwG
- Developer: Svalöf Weibull AB
- Trait(s) conferred: Decreased amylose production, increased kanamycin resistance
- Genes introduced: Granule bound starch synthase, neomycin phosphotransferase II

Amflora (also known as EH92-527-1) is a genetically modified potato cultivar developed by BASF Plant Science. "Amflora" potato plants produce pure amylopectin starch that is processed to waxy potato starch. It was approved for industrial applications in the European Union on 2 March 2010 by the European Commission. In January 2012, the potato was withdrawn from the market in the EU.

== History ==
Originally registered on 5 August 1996, Amflora was developed by geneticist Lennart Erjefält and agronomist Jüri Känno of Svalöf Weibull AB.

After the European Commission's approval of the potato, BASF announced it was going to produce Amflora seed starting in April 2010 in Germany's Western Pomerania (20 ha) and Sweden (80 ha). It also announced it was planting 150 ha in the Czech Republic "for commercial aims with an unnamed partner."

Due to lack of acceptance of GM crops in Europe, BASF Plant Science decided in January 2012 to stop its commercialization activities in Europe and would no longer sell Amflora there, but it would continue seeking regulatory approval for its products in the Americas and Asia.

In 2013, an EU court annulled the approval of BASF's Amflora, saying that the EU Commission broke rules when it approved the potato in 2010.

== Biology ==
Waxy potato varieties produce two main kinds of potato starch, amylose and amylopectin, the latter of which is most industrially useful. The Amflora potato has been modified to contain antisense RNA against the enzyme that drives synthesis of amylose, namely granule bound starch synthase. This resulting potato almost exclusively produces amylopectin, and thus is more useful for the starch industry.

== Industrial applications ==
Regular potato starch contains two constituent types of molecules: amylopectin (80 percent), which is more useful as a polymer for industry, and amylose (20 percent) which often creates problems as starch retrogradation, so must be modified with chemical reactions which can be costly.

After two decades of research efforts, BASF's biotechnologists using genetic engineering succeeded in creating a potato, named "Amflora", where the gene responsible for the synthesis of amylose had been turned off, thus the potato is unable to synthesize the less desirable amylose.

Amflora potatoes would be processed and sold as starch to industries that prefer waxy potato starch with only amylopectin. Amflora is intended only for industrial applications such as papermaking and other technical applications. Europe produces more than two million metric tons of natural potato starch a year, and BASF with its Amflora product hoped to enter into this large market.

=== Other possible uses ===
According to The New York Times, BASF has a second application pending for use of Amflora's potato pulp as animal feed.

== Political disagreements ==
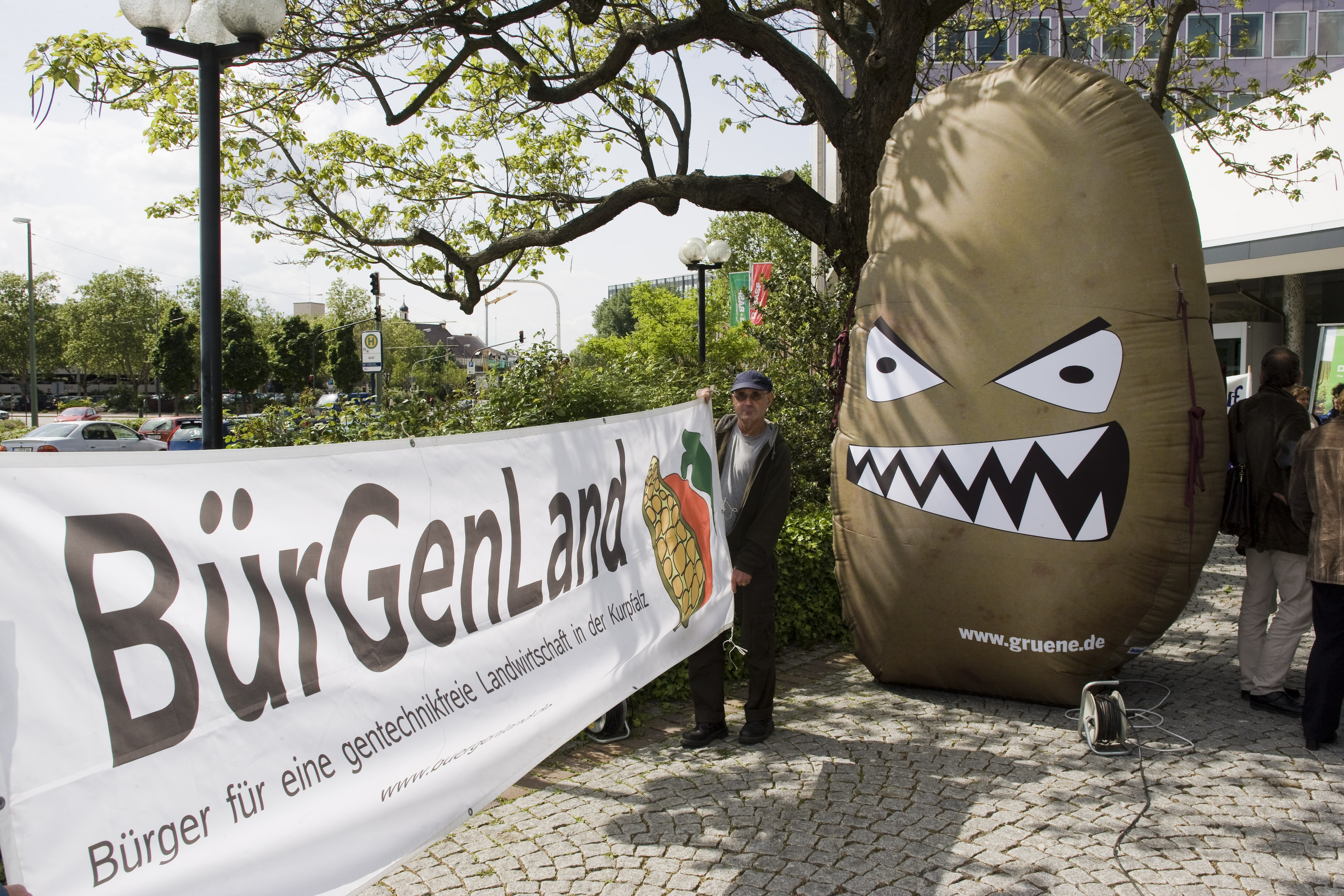
Protests against the Amflora potato

Various environmental organizations, such as Greenpeace, disagreed with the introduction of the Amflora genetically modified potato into the market. The lengthy approval process frustrated some supporters of the potato. A BASF scientist said to The New York Times, "it's hard when you see an innovative product go through the loops again and again. These decisions are not about science but about politics". After the potato was approved, the European Greens political party and the then Italian agricultural minister Luca Zaia criticized the approval. The International Peasant Movement La Via Campesina issued a press release on 8 March 2010 also criticizing the decision.

=== Reactions by Greek politicians ===
After Amflora's licensing by the European Commission on 2 March 2010, the Coalition of the Radical Left's Member of Parliament for the A Thessalonikis prefecture, Tasos Kouvelis, asked the Greek Minister of Agriculture on 3 March 2010 to declare the production of the potato illegal in Greece. On 4 March 2010 Panhellenic Socialist Movement's European Member of Parliament Kriton Arsenis submitted a question at Europarl asking about the consequences of Amflora.

PASOK's MP Maria Damanaki accepted the decision of the European Commission, while Greek Agriculture Minister Katerina Batzeli said the production of Amflora will not be allowed in Greece.

== Licensing procedure ==
Amflora could not be sold within the European Union without approval, and its licence could only be issued after voting at the Council of Ministers of the European Union with a 74 percent threshold of support. Two rounds of voting were held, first by experts in December 2006 and then by the agricultural ministers in July 2007, but both failed to reach the 74 percent threshold. Although the voting was by secret ballot, The New York Times reported that Amflora was supported by the agricultural ministers of Germany and Belgium, and was opposed by the agricultural ministers of Italy, Ireland, and Austria, while the agricultural ministers of France and Bulgaria abstained from voting.

After a licence was issued on 2 March 2010, BASF announced its intention to ask for approval of more varieties of genetically modified potatoes, such as the "Fortuna" potato.
