= Starch production =

Manufacturing of starches and starch products from rice, potatoes, maize, etc.

Starch production is an isolation of starch from plant sources. It takes place in starch plants. Starch industry is a part of food processing which is using starch as a starting material for production of starch derivatives, hydrolysates, dextrins.

At first, the raw material for the preparation of the starch was wheat. Currently main starch sources are:

- maize (in America, China and Europe) – 70%,
- potatoes (in Europe) – 12%,
- wheat - 8% (in Europe and Australia),
- tapioca - 9% (South East Asia and South America),
- rice, sorghum and other - 1%.

== Potato starch production ==
The production of potato starch comprises the steps such as delivery and unloading potatoes, cleaning, rasping of tubers, potato juice separation, starch extraction, starch milk refination, dewatering of refined starch milk and starch drying.

The potato starch production supply chain varies significantly by region. For example, potato starch in Europe is produced from potatoes grown specifically for this purpose. However, in the US, potatoes are not grown for starch production and manufacturers must source raw material from food processor waste streams. The characteristics of these waste streams can vary significantly and require further processing by the US potato starch manufacturer to ensure the end-product functionality and specifications are acceptable.

=== Delivery and unloading potatoes ===
Potatoes are delivered to the starch plants via road or rail transport. Unloading of potatoes could be done in two ways:

1. dry - using elevators and tippers,
2. wet - using strong jet of water.

=== Cleaning ===
Coarsely cleaning of potatoes takes place during the transport of potatoes to the scrubber by channel. In addition, before the scrubber, straw and stones separators are installed. The main cleaning is conducted in scrubber (different kinds of high specialized machines are used). The remaining stones, sludge and light wastes are removed at this step. Water used for washing is then purified and recycled back into the process.

=== Rasping of tubers ===
Most often the rasping of potato tubers is carried out with a rotary grater. The purpose of this stage is disruption of cell walls, which therefore release the starch. In practice, potato cells are not entirely destroyed and part of the starch remains in the mash. Potato pulp rapidly turns dark, because tyrosine presented in the potato is oxidised by polyphenol oxidase, which is located in the cellular juice. Therefore, cellular juice must be separated as soon as possible.

=== Potato juice separation ===
This allows the recovery full-value protein from juice and reduces the onerousness of water juice as a sludge.

=== Starch extraction ===
After separation of potato juice the pulp is directed to the washing starch station, to isolate the starch. Most used are stream-oriented washers. In these machines pulp diluted with water is washed with a strong stream of water to flush out the milk starch. The mash smuggling with water is a waste product – dewatered potato pulp. Starch milk is contaminated by small fiber particles (potato tissue fragments) and the remaining components of the potato juice – that is why it is called raw starch milk.

=== Starch milk raffination ===
Raw starch milk is purified in the refining process. This involves the removal of small fibers from the starch milk and then the removal of juice water and starch milk condensation. For this purpose, the screens and hydrocyclones are commonly used. Hydrocyclones due to the low output (approximately 0.3 cubic meters per hour) are connected in parallel and works as multihydrocyclones. For the starch milk desanding bihydrocyclones are used. In order to prevent enzymatic darkening of potato juice the chemical refining of starch is carried out using sulfurous acid. Refined starch milk has a density of about 22° Be, which is about 38% of starch.

=== Dewatering of refined starch milk and starch drying ===
It is a suspension of starch in water, which needs dewatering up to 20% of moisture. This is equivalent to the moisture content of commercial starch when stored. High temperatures cannot be used in this process because of the danger of starch gelatinization which destroys granular structure. It may result in significant changes of the functional starch properties. Therefore, removal of excess water from milk shall be done only under conditions that prevent the gelatinization of starch.

Dewatering of refined starch milk is carried out in two stages. In the first stage the excess water is removed by means of a rotary vacuum filter. Secondly moist starch is dried, without starch pasting. For this purpose a pneumatic dryer is used. In this device moist starch (with water content 36 – 40%) is floating in strong and hot (160 °C) air flow and then dried during 2 – 3 seconds. Then, the starch is separated from hot air in cyclones. Due to short time of high temperature drying and intensive water evaporation from the starch granules, its surface is heated only to 40 °C.

Dried starch contains about 21% of water. During the pneumatic transport starch loses additional 1% of water.

Received starch is storing separately in silos, in jute bags (100 kg) or paper bags (50 kg). There are three kinds of starch: superior extra, superior and prima. Different sorts of starch depend on degree of purity and whiteness. The differences between them are in an acidity and content of mineral substances.

Table 1. Potato starch production characteristic.

Processing	2.000 t per 24 hours
Ratio of starch extraction	87%
Water expenditure: washing; technological	6.5m^{3}/t 2.5m^{3}/t 4.0m^{3}/t
Water steam expenditure	400 – 500 kg/t starch
SO_{2} expenditure	0.8 kg/t potatoes
Yield: per ton of potatoes	(16,8%) 175 kg starch
Loss: potatoes losses (transport and washing); pulp starch losses; -juicy water starch losses	about 10% 0.5% 8 – 9% 1.0%

The water which is used in starch production (dirty water) for transportation and cleaning does not have to be totally clean. That is why clarifier usage enables application of closed cycle which noticeably reduces amount of cleaning water that is needed. On the other hand, requirements for quality of technological water are the same as for drinking water (microbiological and chemical contamination). In addition, this type of water should contain low amounts of metals such as: Ca, Mg, Fe, Mn; which has bad influence on starch properties.

=== Waste products ===
- Potato juice is a liquid waste product separated from the potatoes pulp after the rasping, using centrifuges or decanters. It contains about 5% of dry substance, including about 2% valuable protein of the potato of high nutritional value, minerals, vitamins and other. Modern starch plants separate the juice from the mash.

- Potato protein can be extracted from the juice by coagulation with heat at low pH. About 600 kg of coagulated protein from each 1000 kg of potato protein can be recovered this way. The coagulated protein product contains about 80% protein (with the digestibility of about 90%), 2.5% minerals, 1.5% fat, 6% nitrogen-free substances and 10% water. Because of the full range of the exogenic amino acids the formulation is a valuable protein feed. The remaining potato juice is used as fertilizer.

- Potato pulp is a side product of washing the starch from the mash. It contains all non-starchy substances insoluble in water (fragments of wall of cells) fibres and bounded starch which cannot be mechanically separated from the blended parties of potato. The dry substance of the pulp contains 30% of starch, which makes it a good source for animal feed for cows. The pulp contains a lot of water, dry solids about 16%, which is inconvenient in transportation and storage. That is why it is really often dried and dehydrated.

- Juicy water is a liquid side product obtained after refining of starch milk. It is ten times diluted potato juice. As it is a sludge and it cannot be discharged to open water. It must be treated as waste water or is used as fertilizer.

=== Application of potato starch ===
The usage of raw starch is relatively small. Starch is mainly used as material both in the manufacture of food and non-food products. In food processing a lot of starch is converted to starch hydrolysates. Also it is used to receive puddings, jellies, desserts, caramel and other food products. In addition, starch is processed to modified starch in order to change material properties. The modified starches have a wide range of applications in many industries. Applications of starch in non-food sectors include: production of dextrin and adhesives, drilling fluids, biodegradable plastics, gypsum binders and many other. In addition modified starches are used as emulsion stabilizers. Other important fields of starch application are textile sizing agents, excipient in tablets for pharmaceuticals.

== See also ==
- Corn starch
- Tapioca
