= Potato starch =

Thickening agent used for culinary purposes

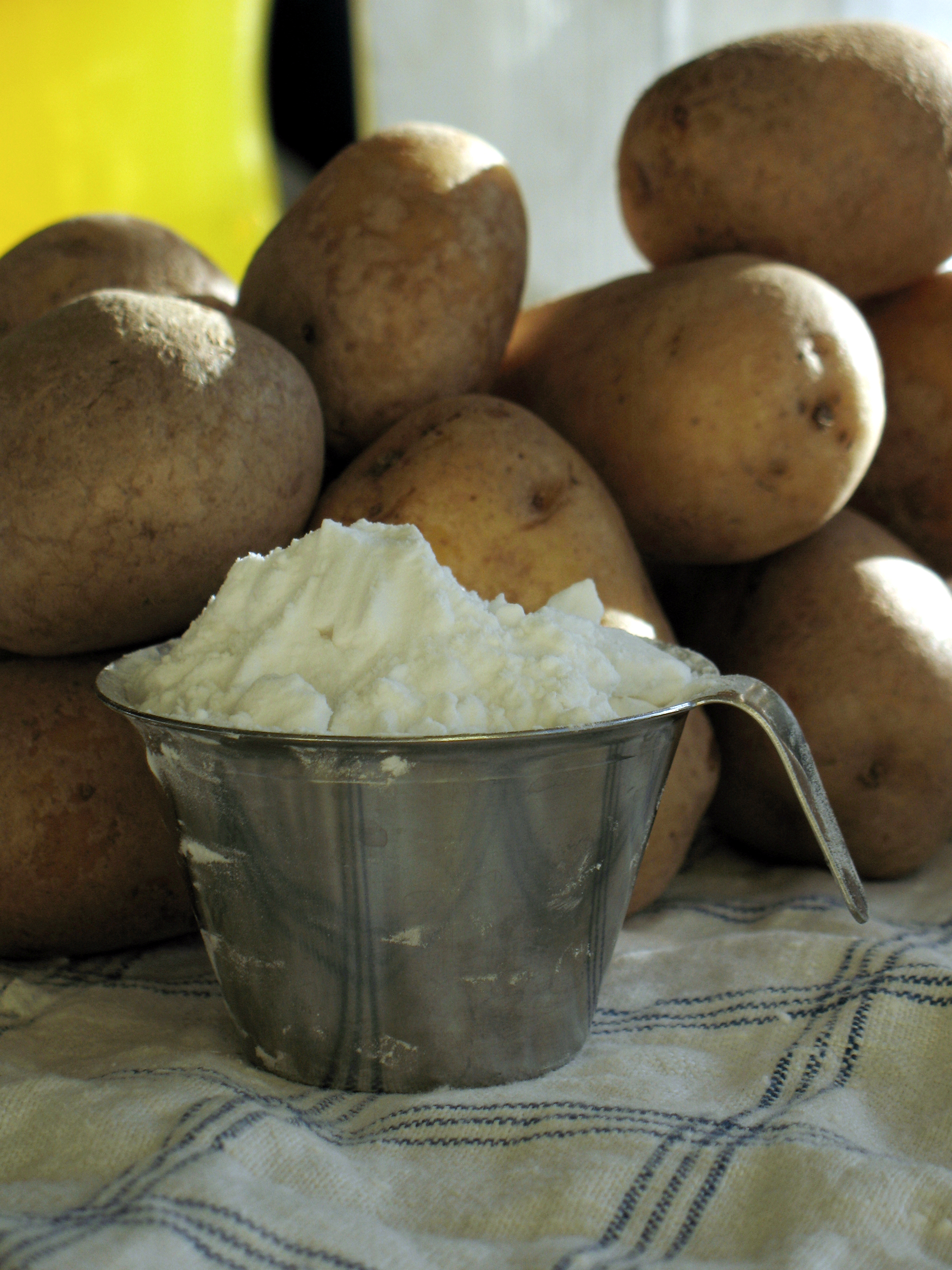
Potato starch

Potato starch is starch extracted from potatoes. The cells of the root tubers of the potato plant contain leucoplasts (starch grains). To extract the starch, the potatoes are crushed, and the starch grains are released from the destroyed cells. The starch is then left to settle out of solution or separated by hydrocyclones, then dried to powder.

Potato starch contains typical large oval spherical granules ranging in size from 5 to 100 μm. Potato starch is a refined starch, containing minimal protein or fat. This gives the powder a clear white colour, and the cooked starch typical characteristics of neutral taste, good clarity, high binding strength, long texture, and minimal tendency to foaming or yellowing of the solution.

Potato starch contains approximately 800 ppm phosphate bound to the starch; this increases the viscosity and gives the solution a slightly anionic character, a low gelatinisation temperature of approximately 60 °C (140 °F), and high swelling power.

These properties are used in food and technical applications.

== Use ==
Starch derivatives are used in many cooking recipes, for example in noodles, wine gums, cocktail nuts, potato chips, extruded snacks, battered french fries, hot dog sausages, bakery cream, processed cheese, cheese analogue and instant soups and sauces, in gluten-free recipes, in kosher foods for Passover and in Asian cuisine. In pastry, e.g. sponge cake, it is used to keep the cake moist and give a soft texture. It is also occasionally used in the preparation of pre-packed grated cheese, to reduce sweating and binding.

Other examples are helmipuuro, a porridge made from monodisperse grains of potato starch and milk, and papeda (the Moluccan community in the Netherlands uses potato starch to make papeda). It is also used in non-food applications as wallpaper adhesive, for textile finishing and textile sizing, in paper coating and sizing, and as an adhesive in paper sacks and gummed tape.

Potato starch was also used in one of the earlier color photography processes, the Lumière brothers' Autochrome Lumière, until the arrival of other colour film processes in the mid-1930s.

== Potato varieties ==
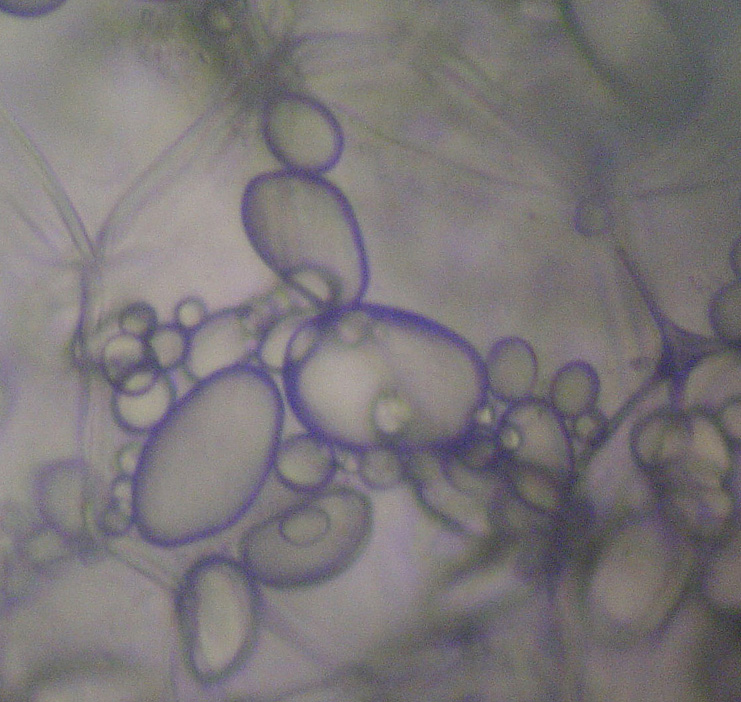
Microscopic view: potato starch (amyloplasts) in plant cell

Many types of potatoes are grown for the production of potato starch, potato varieties with high starch content and high starch yields are selected. Recently, a new type of potato plant was developed that only contains one type of starch molecule: amylopectin, the waxy potato starch. Waxy starches, after starch gelatinisation, retrograde less during storage.

The cultivation of potatoes for starch mainly takes place in Germany, the Netherlands, China, Japan, France, Denmark, and Poland, but also in Sweden, Finland, Austria, the Czech Republic, Ukraine, Canada, and India.

Some potato starch is also produced as a byproduct from the potato processing industry, recovered from the potato cutting circuit during the production of French fries and potato chips.

== Identification ==
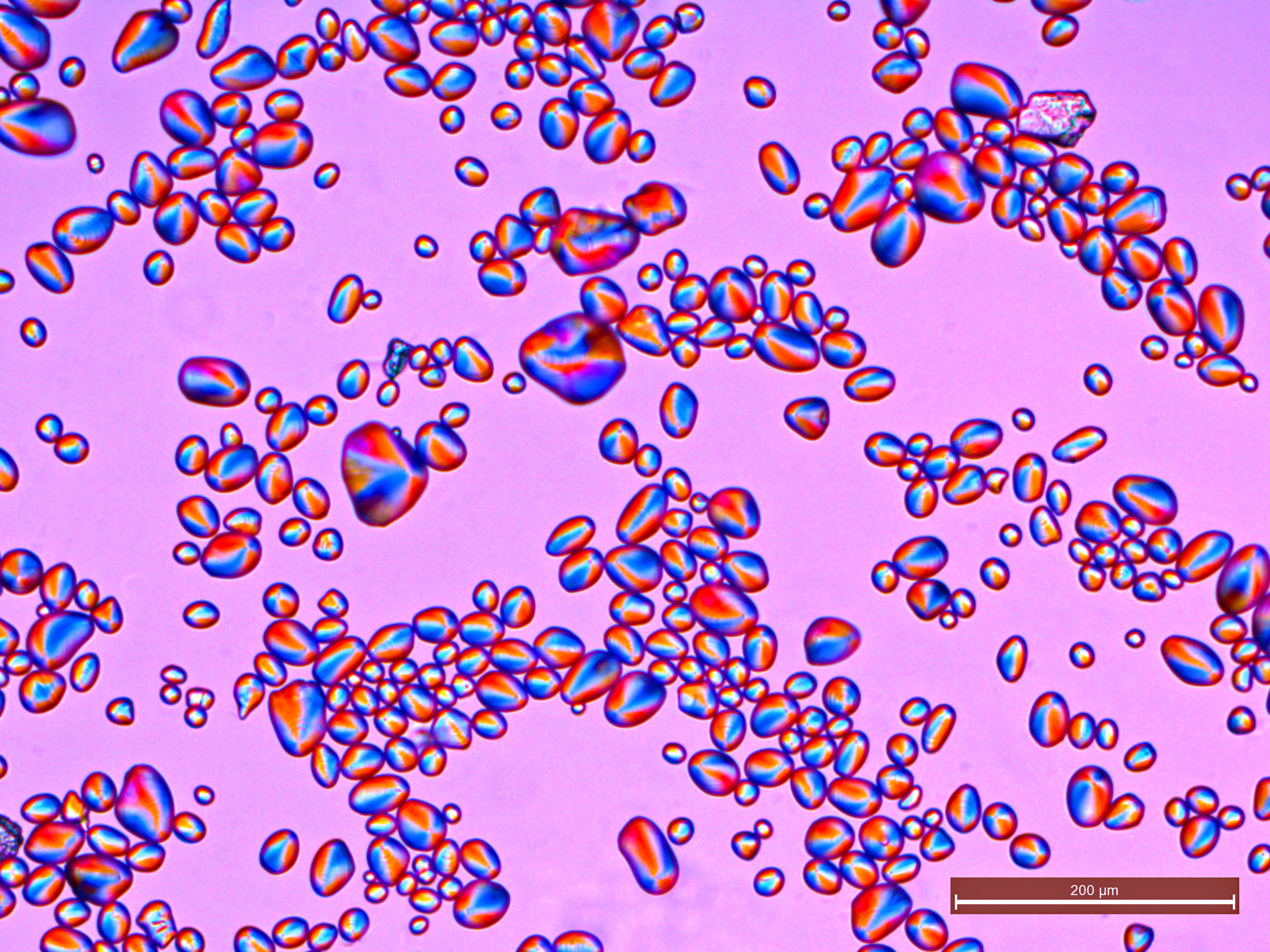
Potato starch in polarized light, magnification 100x

Examined under a microscope using a mixture of equal volumes of glycerol and distilled water, potato starch presents transparent, colorless granules, either irregularly shaped, ovoid or pear-shaped, usually 30 μm to 100 μm in size but occasionally exceeding 100 μm, or rounded, 10 μm to 35 μm in size. Starch granules exhibit characteristic dark crosses in polarized light. If potato starch is wetted it becomes sticky.

== See also ==
- Corn starch
- Katakuri
- Potato starch production
- Potato flour
- Autochrome Lumière
