= BASF Plant Science =

Biotechnology company

BASF Plant Science is a subsidiary of BASF in which all plant biotechnology activities are consolidated. The company was founded in 1998 and employs approximately 700 people at 6 different locations worldwide. The headquarters of BASF Plant Science is located in Research Triangle Park (North Carolina, US) and has research sites in the US, Canada, and Europe. BASF Plant Science mainly develops genetically modified seeds at these locations.

== Company profile ==
BASF Plant Science genetically modifies crops like maize, soy, cotton, canola, sugarcane, sugar beet, and potatoes.

These genetically modified crops are sold and distributed through biotechnology companies like Monsanto, KWS Saat, Embrapa, or CTC (Centro de Tecnologia Canavieira).

== Products ==
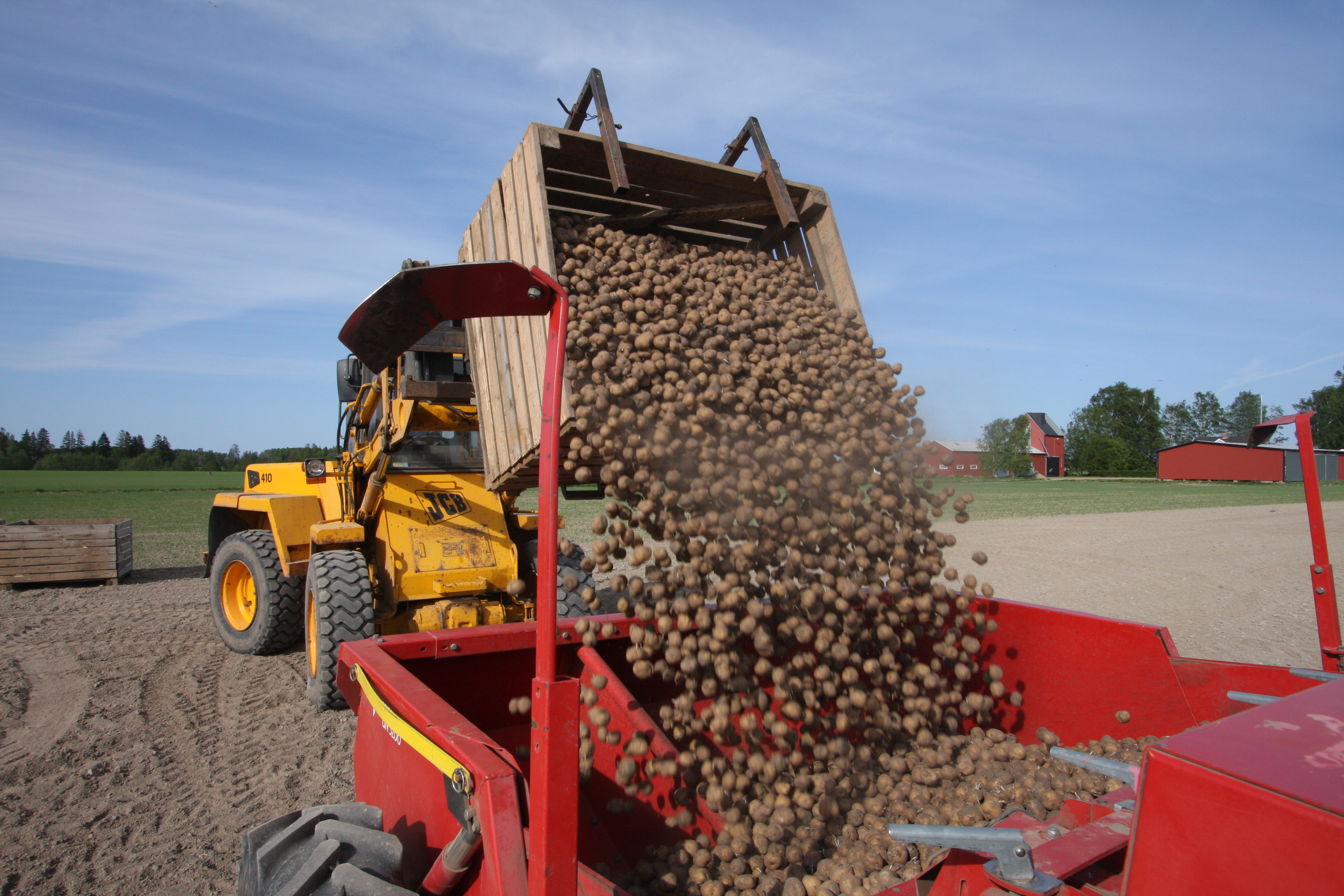
Loading of Amflora potatoes, trial planting in Sweden 2008

As of 2011, BASF Plant Science has developed three products:

- Amflora, a potato developed initially for the European market, producing pure amylopectin starch for industrial use. Waxy potato starch is used in industrial procedures to make yarn stronger and paper glossier; it also makes spray concrete adhere better to walls. Due to lack of acceptance of GM crops in Europe, in 2012 BASF Plant Science decided to stop its commercialization and research activities on the European potato varieties Amflora and Fortuna. Further, it announced the relocation of the corporate headquarters from Germany to the USA.
- Cultivance is an herbicide resistant soybean. It received market permission from Brazil in 2010. Marketing and sales of Cultivance are through Embrapa, a Brazilian company.
- NutriDense is a higher nutritional maize plant used as a feed source for pigs, chickens, and cows.

A range of more crops are in the pipeline:

- Maize, soy, canola, and cotton: The aim is higher biomass, and plants that better resist environmental factors such as drought or disease. These crops are developed on the island of Kauai in Hawaii and are distributed in cooperation with Monsanto.
- Sugarcane, sugar beet: The aim is to develop plants that produce more sugar for use in food or as raw material for biofuel production.
- Fortuna Potato: developed for resistance against Phytophthora infestans, a disease which is difficult to combat for European agriculturists.

Other products are being developed for the food industry for use in genetically modified foods. Examples include plants with a higher content of omega-3 fatty acids for preventing cardiovascular diseases, and plants with a higher content of astaxanthin which is used in fish farming as feed additive, and as a food supplement for humans.

== History ==
=== 2012: Headquarters relocation ===
In January 2012, citing weak market acceptance of genetically modified crops in Europe, BASF announced it would discontinue development and commercialization of plant biotech products aimed solely at European cultivation — including the potato varieties Amflora and Fortuna — and would relocate the corporate headquarters of BASF Plant Science from Limburgerhof, Germany, to Raleigh, North Carolina, US. Research activities were retained but concentrated at sites in Raleigh; Ghent, Belgium; and Berlin, Germany, while facilities in Gatersleben, Germany, and Svalöv, Sweden, were closed.

=== 2016: Restructuring and job cuts ===
In February 2016, BASF announced a realignment of its plant biotechnology R&D to focus on projects with the "highest business and technical realization potential", resulting in the elimination of approximately 350 of the roughly 700 positions in the division — around 140 in North America and 180 in Europe. As part of the restructuring, discovery-stage projects on rice yield and corn fungal resistance were discontinued, while work on herbicide tolerance, fungal-resistant soybeans, and omega-3 fatty acid canola continued, including the ongoing collaboration with Monsanto. Field-testing sites in Kekaha, Hawaii; India; and Puerto Rico were closed, while sites in Research Triangle Park, North Carolina; Ames, Iowa; Berlin and Limburgerhof, Germany; Ghent, Belgium; and Brazil were retained at reduced scale.

=== 2016–2021: CropDesign ===
BASF Plant Science's Ghent-area subsidiary CropDesign — acquired in 2006 as a spin-off of the Flanders Institute of Biotechnology (VIB) — announced in May 2016 that it would cease most operations by the end of that year, closing its larger Zwijnaarde site and retaining a smaller phenotyping and plant-imaging team at its Nevele site. In 2021, BASF divested the Nevele site to VIB, which relaunched it as an agricultural-biotechnology incubator.

=== 2018: Agricultural Solutions division ===
Following BASF's €7.6 billion acquisition of businesses and assets divested by Bayer as a condition of Bayer's takeover of Monsanto (agreements signed October 2017 and April 2018, closed August 2018), BASF expanded into seeds and traits — including the global glufosinate-ammonium herbicide business, select row-crop seed and trait assets, vegetable seeds, and the digital farming platform xarvio. To reflect this broadened scope, BASF renamed its Crop Protection division "Agricultural Solutions", under which BASF Plant Science's biotechnology and trait-research activities are now organized.
