= Cold porcelain =

Crafting material

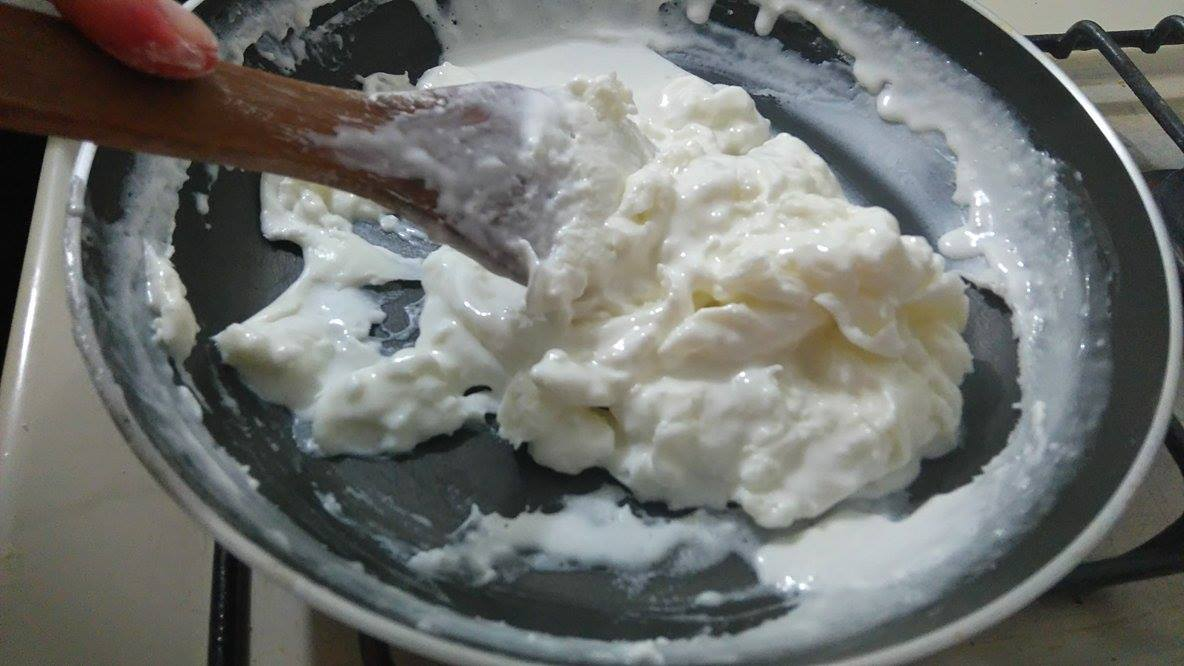
Cold porcelain being mixed

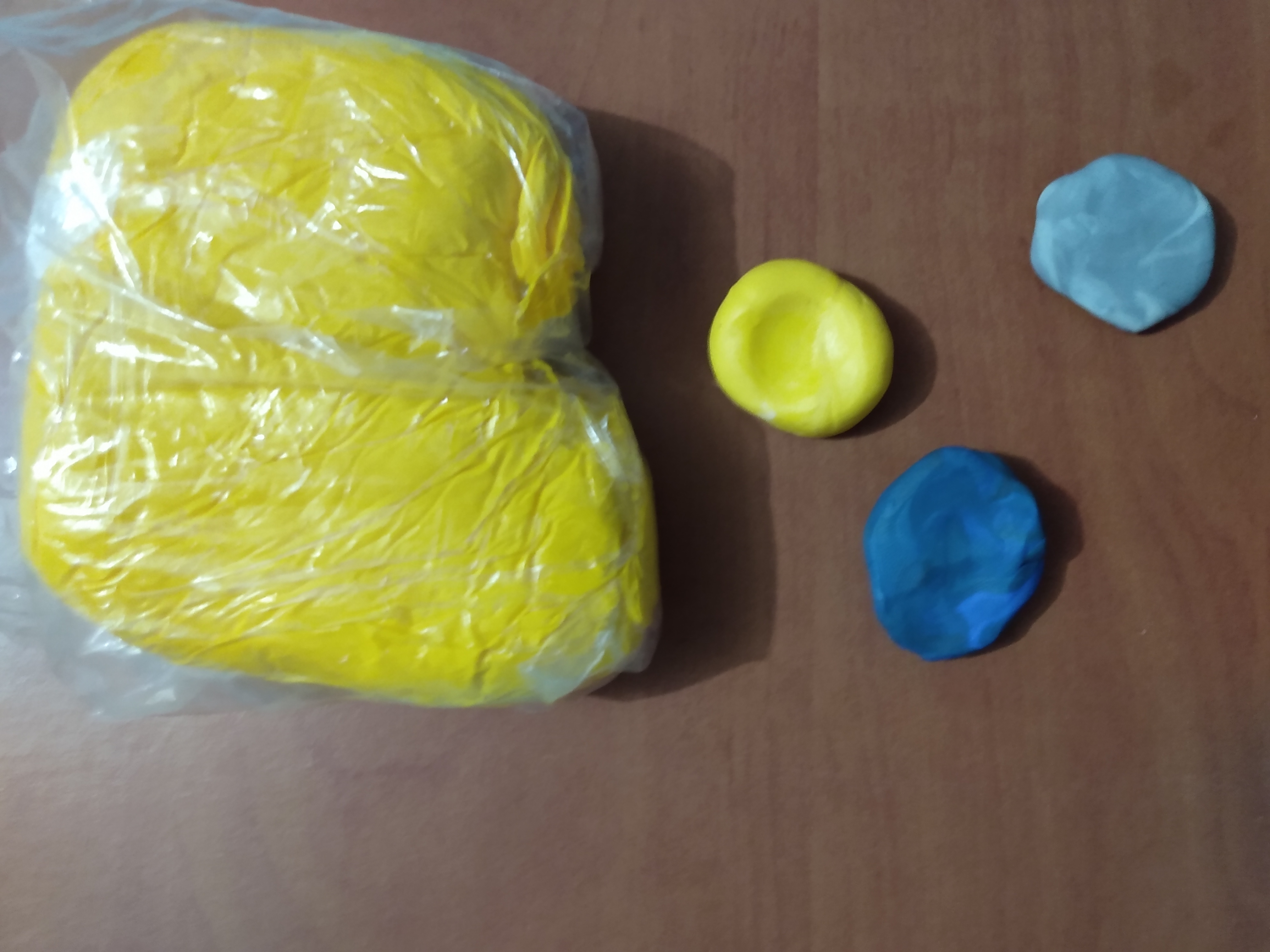
Colors can be added to the mixture

Cold porcelain is a crafting material most commonly made from cornstarch and white glue. The material can also include small amounts of oils and glycerol. Because most of the ingredients are biodegradable, lemon juice or sodium benzoate are sometimes used to prevent the growth of bacteria and fungi. It is most often used for at-home crafting and sculpting due to it drying from air exposure rather than heat curing. The material can also be dissolved by heat or water.

Despite its name it is not a form of porcelain.

== Use recommendations ==
Cold porcelain tends to behave like plasticine thanks to its composition, consistency, softness, and malleability. After it dries it becomes stronger and similar to porcelain. Due to its easily degradable nature, preserving cold porcelain is important, and can be done through storage in airtight containers. If the material turns a bit dry, it can be softened again by mixing with water. Mixing with excess water will result in an overly sticky medium, and can be combatted with cornstarch or petroleum jelly. White glue is the most common way to add to pieces of cold porcelain.

Colors

There are three easy ways to dye cold porcelain, one of them is using oil paint that can be mixed with the amount of material used, and the others are using acrylic paint or using different color powders that are made of different dyes.

Another way to give color to the sculptures or the objects designed in cold porcelain is by means of a painting brush and acrylic paint, because is possible to paint over this material after it is stronger and dry. The colors when cold porcelain is dyed always turns darker when the material dries, and make that it dries faster.

Working tools

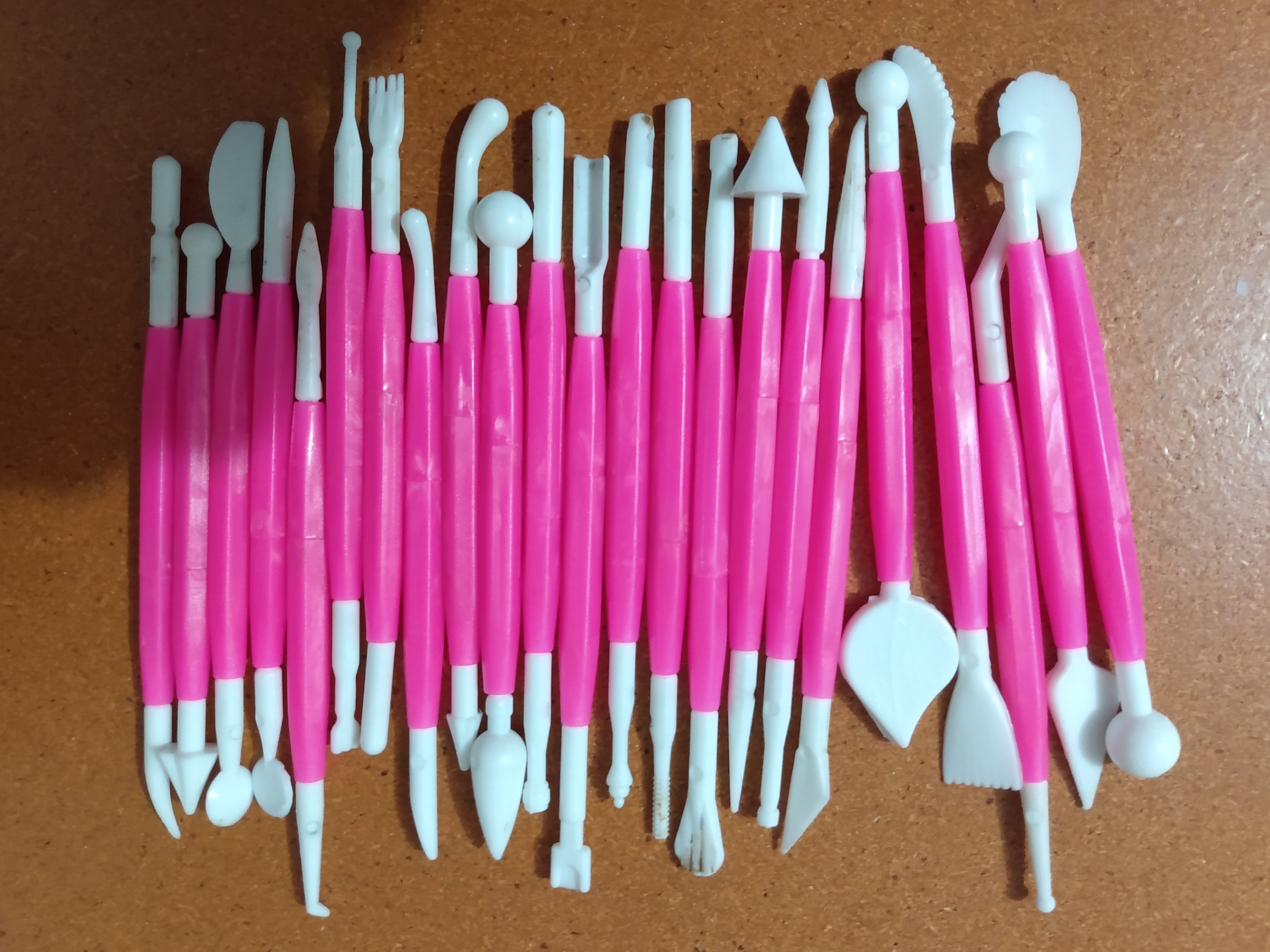
Plastic Stilettos.

Since cold porcelain has a similar consistency to other materials like plasticine the most appropriate working tools are plastic tools or metal and plastic stilettos, scissors, rolling pins and cutters.

== See also ==
- Salt ceramic
- Polymer clay
- Play-Doh
