= Corn sauce =

Condiment

Corn sauce or fermented corn sauce is produced by fermentation using corn starch as the primary substrate. It is used as a food condiment and ingredient, both in paste and in powder form. Corn sauce, like soy sauce, has a characteristic savory taste. It is used to flavor dishes including soups, broths, and gravies.

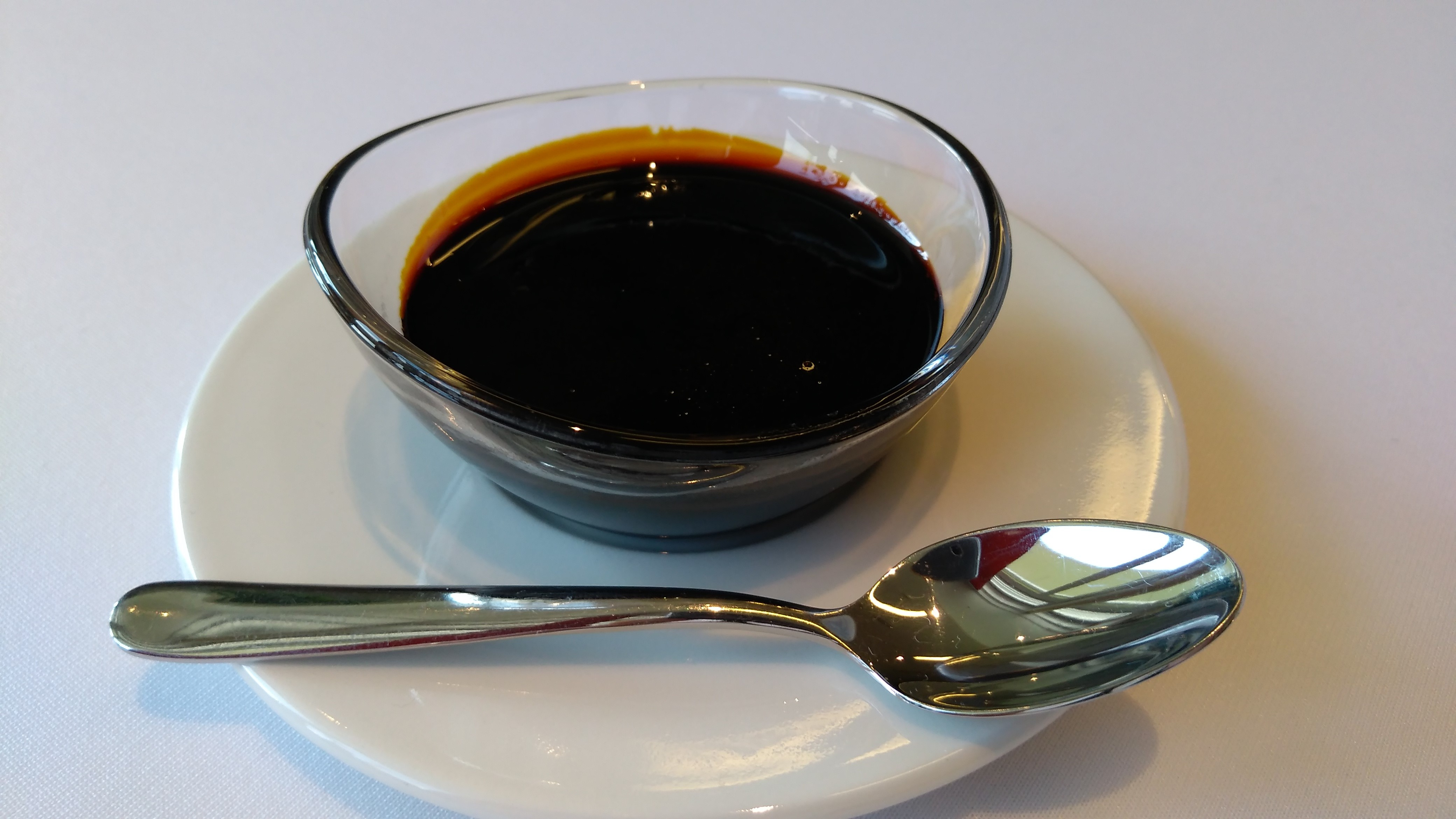
Dark version of corn sauce paste

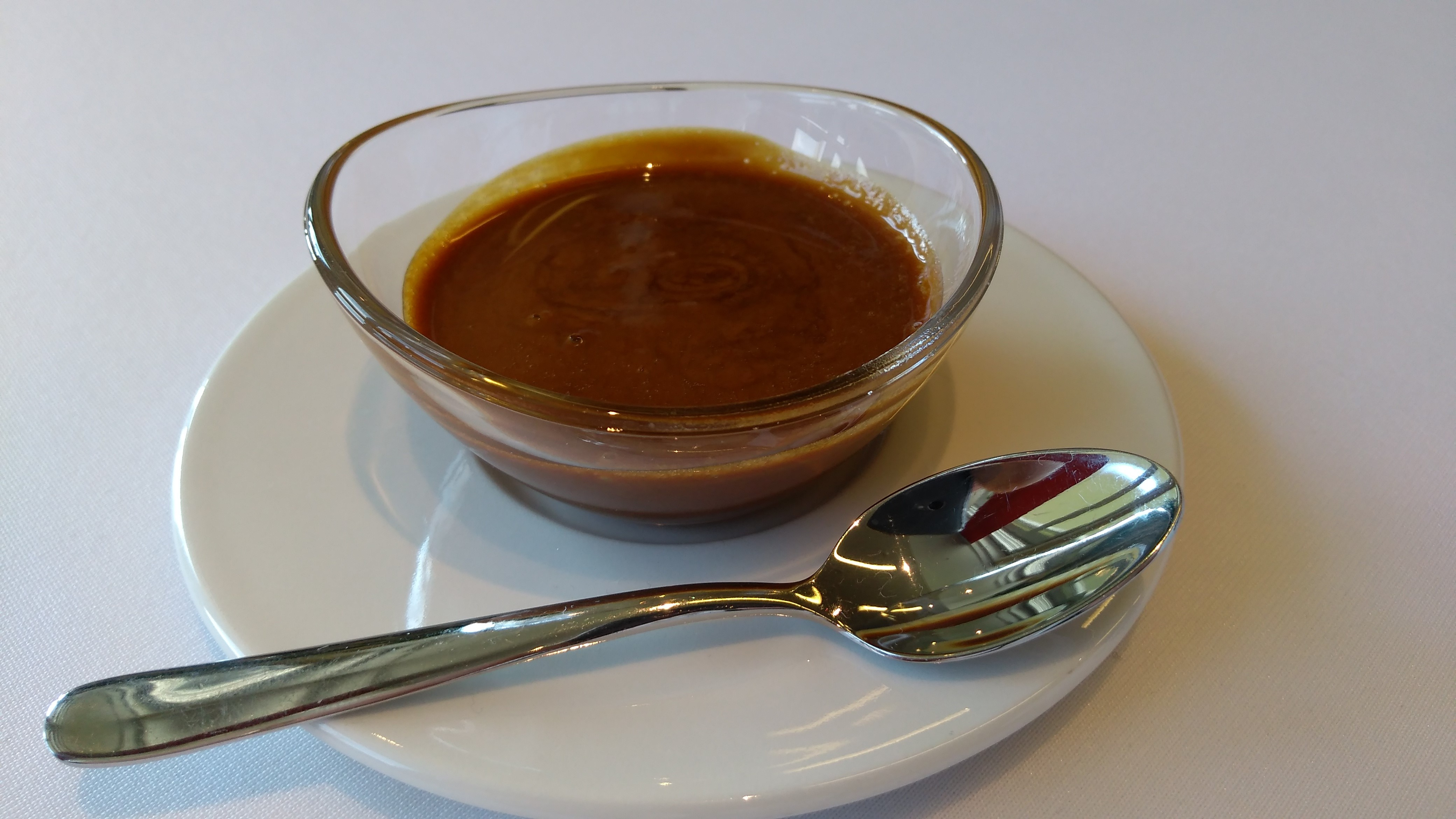
Light version of corn sauce paste

== Taste and usage ==
Corn sauce is a mix of free and bound amino acids, organic acids and their salts, Maillard reaction products, and minerals. Sensory analysis describes corn sauce with characteristic savory tastes including 'xian' (鲜 in Chinese), umami, caramelized, roasted, slightly yeasty, meaty, salty, and sweet.

The taste of corn sauces has been subject to research, showing that the complexity of the taste results from the composition of salts and fermentation metabolites, amino acids, acetic acid, ribotides, short peptides and carbohydrates. Additionally, glutamyl-dipeptides were identified as a class of enriching taste compounds.

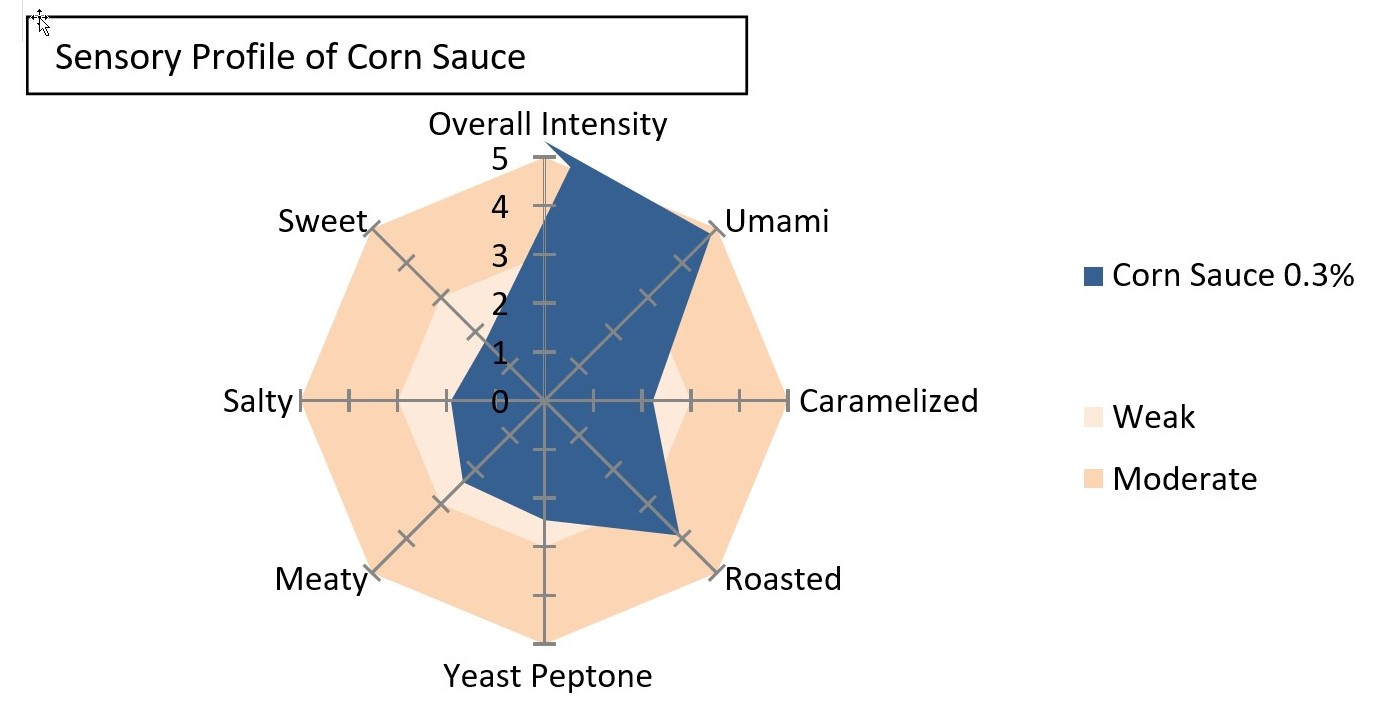
Sensory analysis result of corn sauce with a trained sensory panel

The taste of corn sauce led to the usage as a condiment. Like yeast extract, soy sauce and hydrolyzed vegetable protein, it rounds off the flavor and taste.

== Manufacturing process ==
Comparable to the production of soy sauce, corn sauce is obtained by fermentation, sometimes referred as brewing. The fermentation process is using Corynebacterium bacteria species. The fermentation parameters are controlled for time, temperature and pH. After fermentation the broth undergoes a cooking step to kill the fermenting microorganisms and to induce a controlled Maillard reaction. The cell mass is removed by filtration. The filtered broth is concentrated in order to obtain a paste and to create further Maillard products. During evaporation, salt is added to improve microbial stability. For a powdered product a drying step is applied.

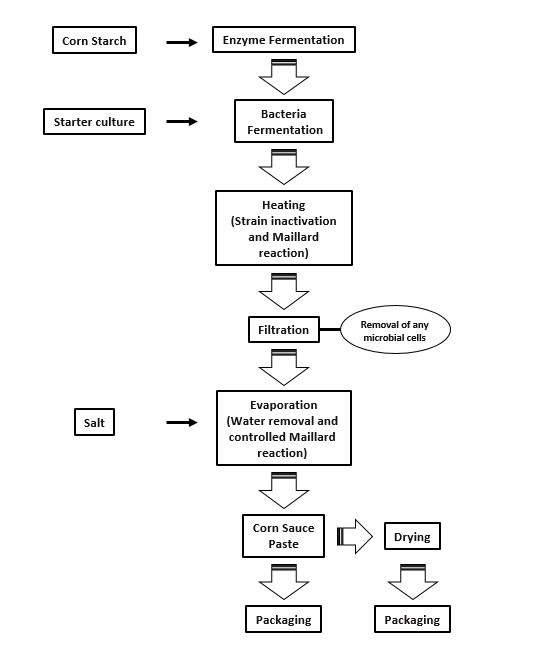
Production Flow Chart for Corn Sauce Production

== Composition ==
Corn sauce contains a mix of compounds, including fermentation metabolites, amino acids, organic acids, minerals and salts. Flavor and color compounds are generated by Maillard reaction during the fermentation, cooking and drying process. Glutamic acid, alanine, and proline are the most abundant present amino acids. Other metabolites are ribotides, sugars, organic acids and γ-glutamyl-dipeptides, which are known to have taste-modulating properties.

== Labeling ==
On labels listed as “Corn sauce” or "Fermented corn sauce" listing the used ingredients (corn starch, water, salt).

== Food safety ==
The fermentation of food with Corynebacterium species is widely present in many parts of the world. The global exposure to these microorganisms in food fermentations assures its safe use and acceptance for food production globally. The question of toxicity of corn sauce was negated by toxicological studies.

== See also ==
- List of sauces
