= Amylomaize =

Maize variety of high amylose starch content

Amylomaize was a term coined in the late 1940s by Robert P. Bear of Bear Hybrids Corn Company in Decatur, Illinois to describe his discovery and commercial breeding of a cornstarch with high (>50%) amylose content, also called high amylose starch. The discovery of amylomaize occurred as a mutation in a normal inbred line; from that one mutation an entire new kind of maize (corn) was developed.

Amylomaize starch is principally used in making biodegradable plastics (or bioplastics). It is also used in edible and digestible coatings. The food consumed on Apollo space flights from 1969 to 1972 were coated with an amylomaize film to prevent crumbs from floating around the space capsule.

Several years earlier Robert P. Bear had discovered and reported that waxy corn (100% amylopectin starch) also occurred as a mutation. Once discovered and reported, waxy mutations were found in the order of once every 30,000 observations.

== See also ==
- Waxy maize
