= Waxy corn =

Type of field corn

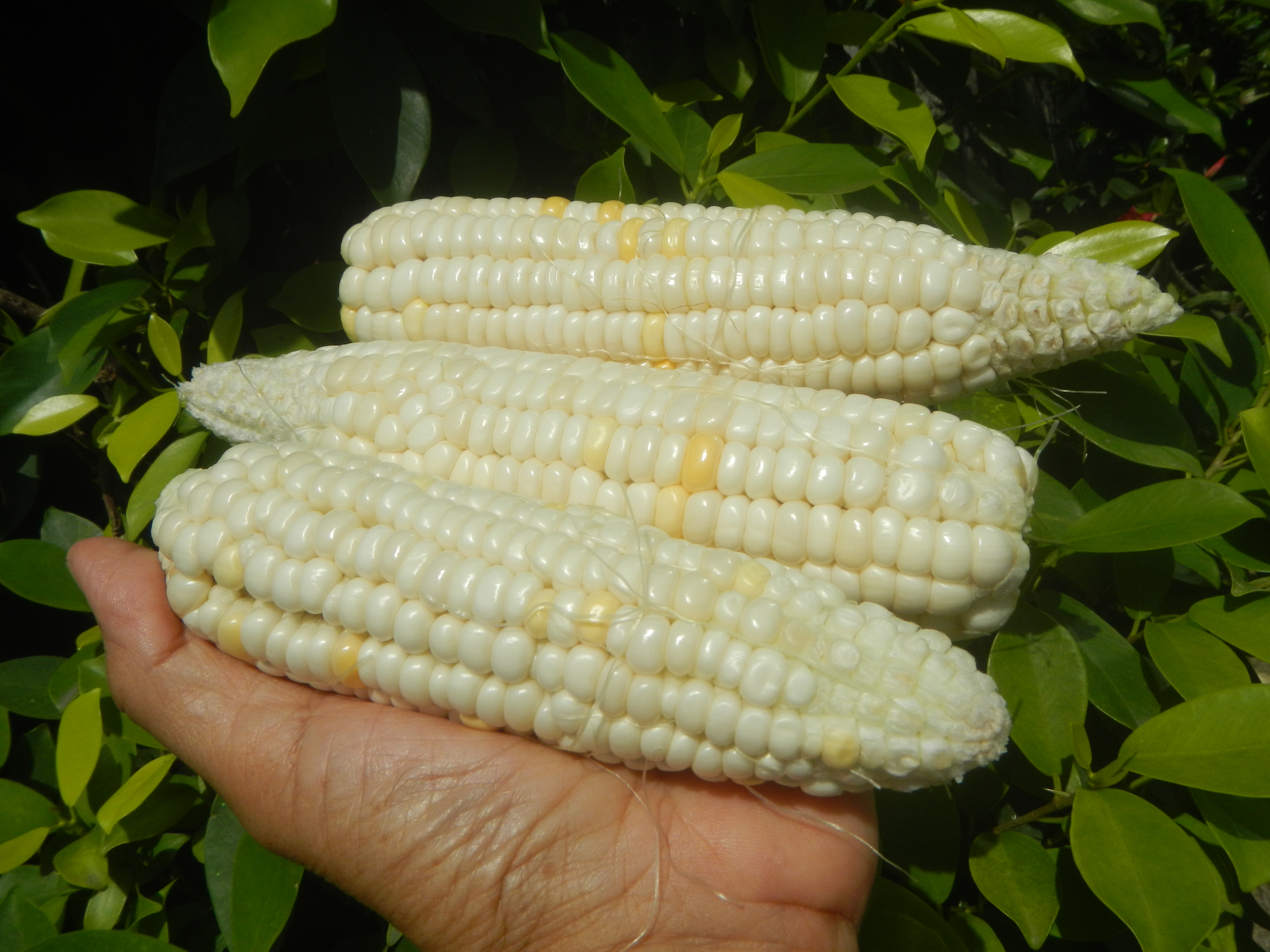
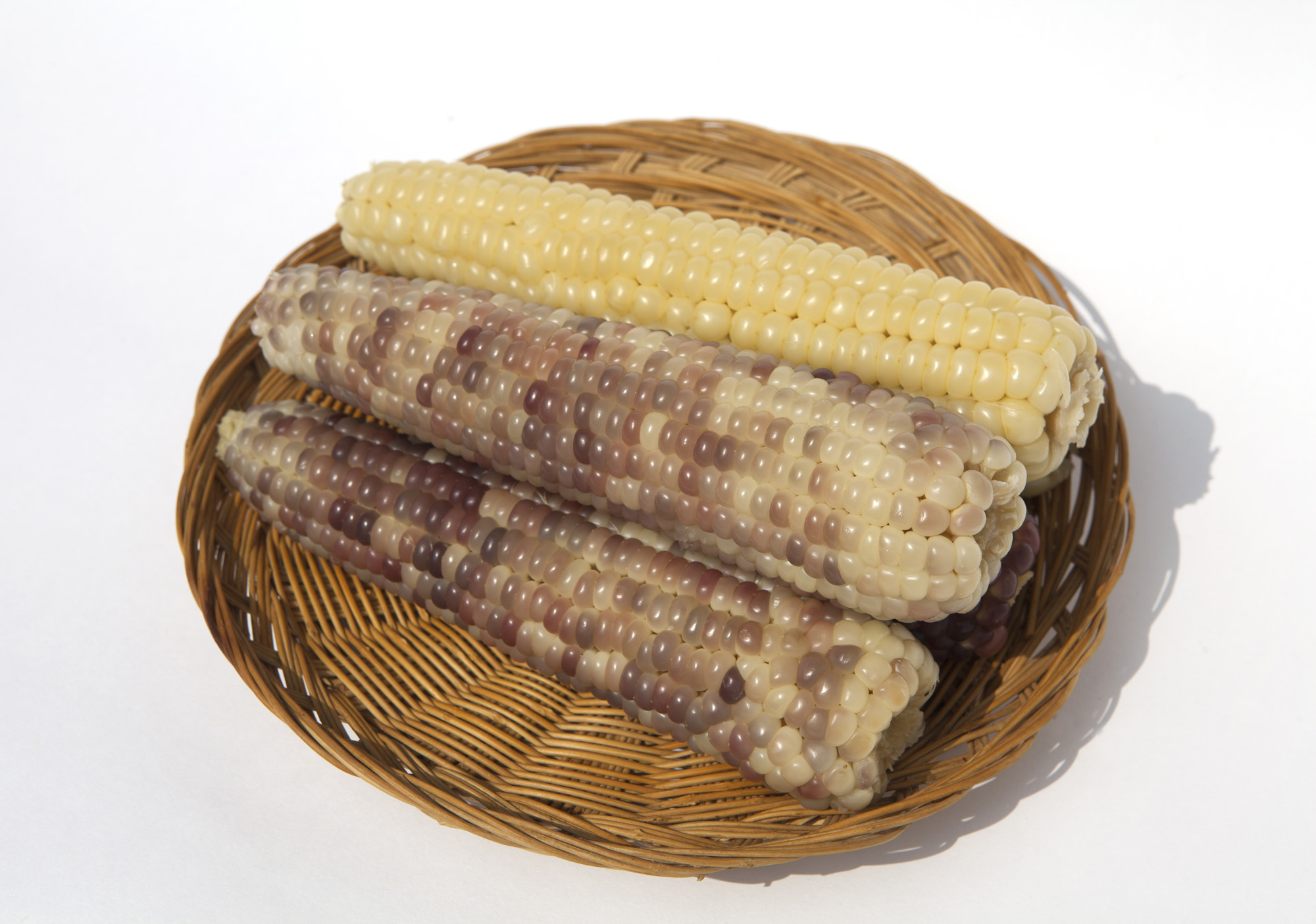
- Top: Lagkitan corn, an heirloom waxy corn cultivar from the Philippines; Bottom: Chal-oksusu, an heirloom waxy corn cultivar from Gangwon, South Korea
- Species: Zea mays L. var. ceratina
- Origin: Southeast Asia, East Asia

Waxy corn or glutinous corn is a type of corn (maize) characterized by its sticky texture when cooked. It has big round kernels that have endosperms that are almost universally white, though the aleurone layers can sometimes be purple or red which cause some cultivars to be multi-colored or even deep purple to black.

Waxy corn is absent in the Americas and is believed to have originated from a single chromosomal mutation soon after the introduction of corn to Asia from the Americas. They include a large number of genetically diverse cultivars from various countries that have adapted to a wide range of tropical to temperate environments. It is common throughout Southeast Asia (the Philippines, eastern Indonesia, Thailand, Laos, Vietnam, and Myanmar) and East Asia (China, Taiwan, Japan, and South Korea)

The stickiness of waxy corn cultivars is the result of the presence of larger amounts of amylopectin starch in contrast to regular corn (which has larger amounts of amylose starch).

The Ac/Ds transposable controlling elements, where short sections of DNA have an intrinsic property to move within the genome, were first isolated and sequenced using insertions of Ac and Ds into the well-studied waxy corn Waxy (Wx1) gene in 1983. Transposable elements and their behaviour i.e., "jumping genes" had previously been characterised in maize and published by Barbara McClintock in 1947, leading to her 1983 Nobel Prize in Medicine.

== See also ==
- Amylomaize high amylose maize starch
- Waxy potato starch
- Glutinous rice
