= Corn starch =

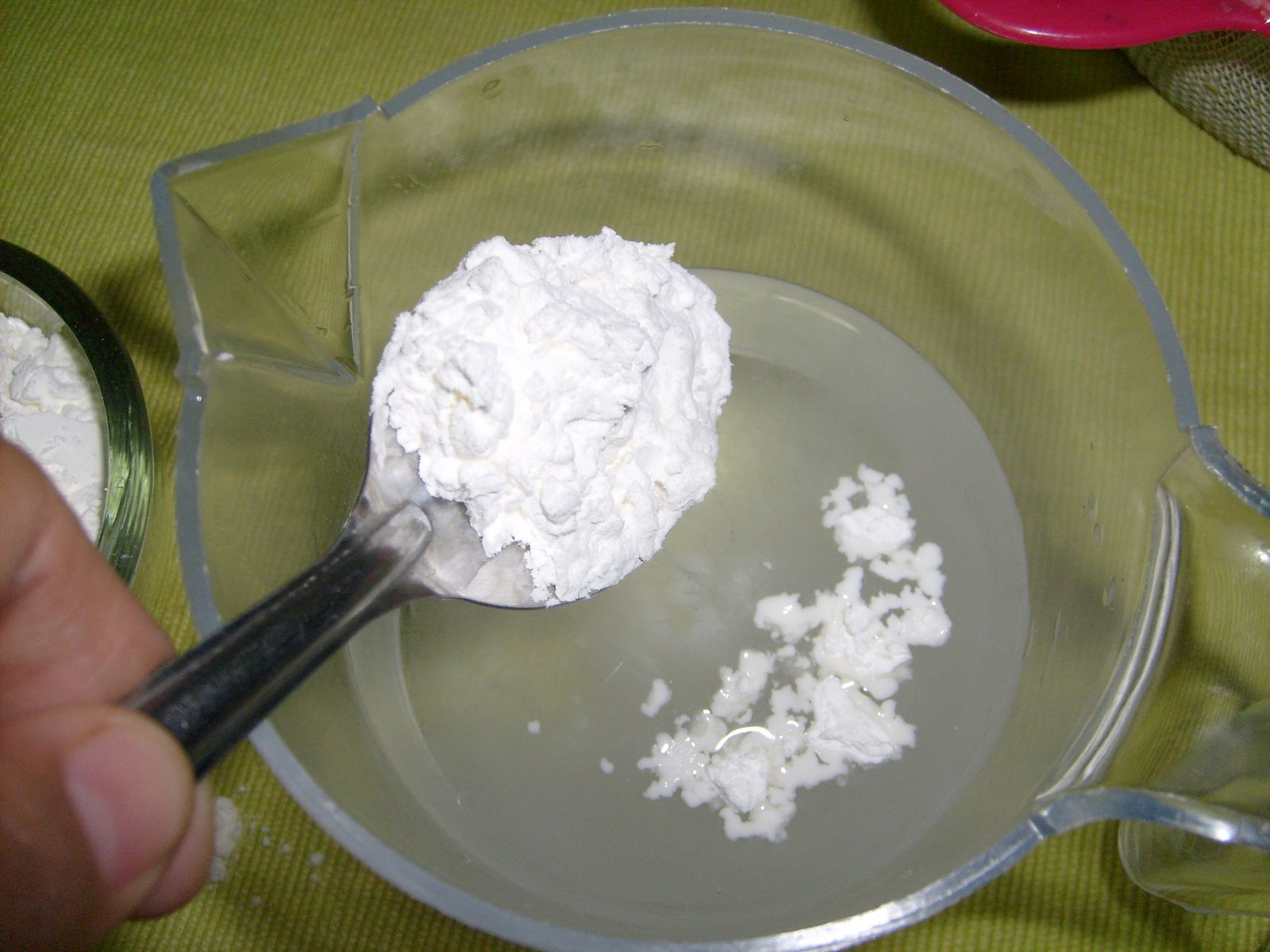
- Corn starch powder
- Food energy (per 100 g serving): 381 kcal (1,590 kJ)
Nutritional value
(per 100 g serving)
- Protein: 0.3 g
- Fat: 0.1 g
- Carbohydrate: 91 g
- Other information: density 0.54 g/ml

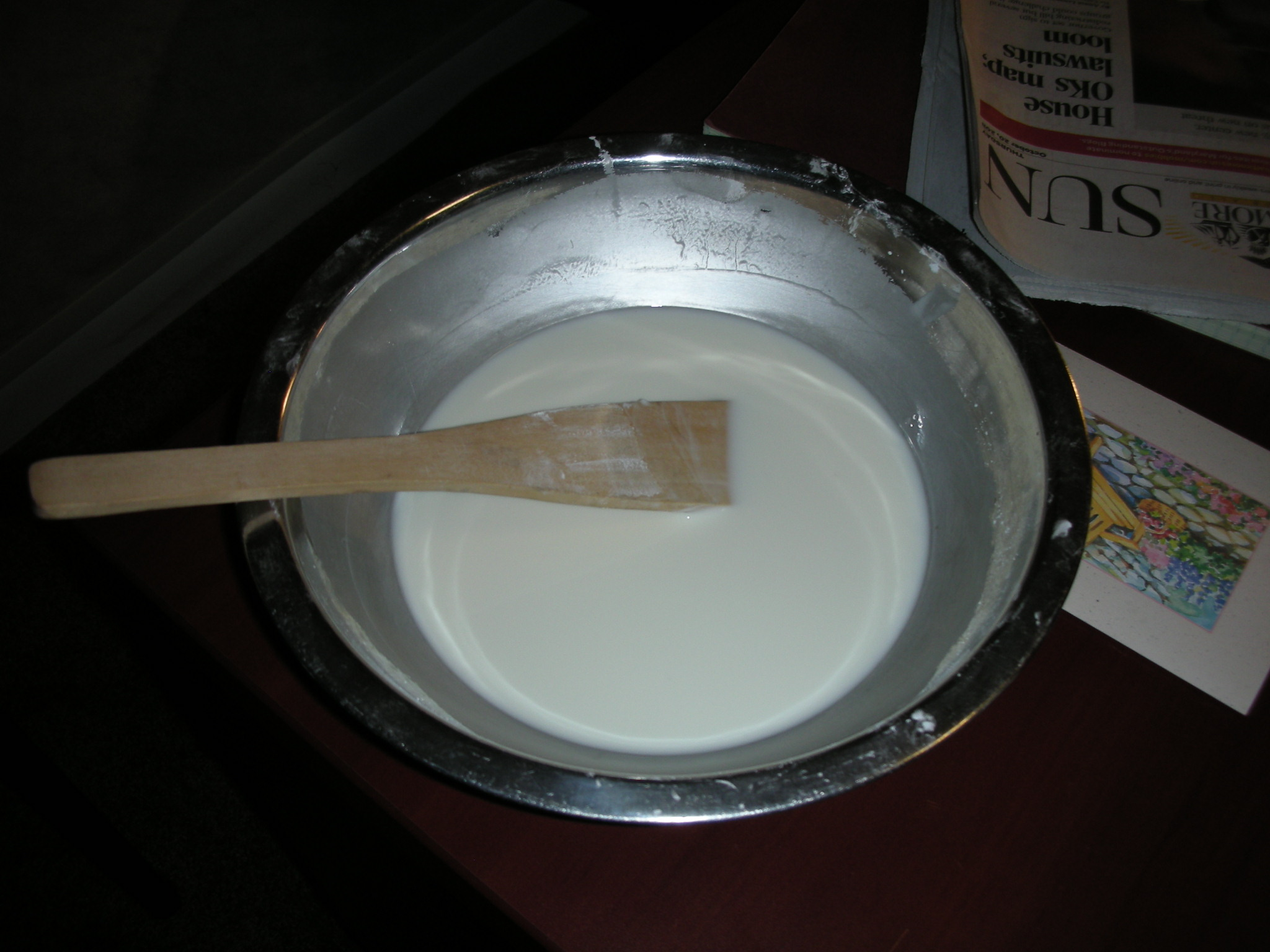
Corn starch mixed in water

Corn starch (also rendered as cornstarch [American English]), or cornflour (British English) is the starch powder derived from corn grain. The starch is obtained from the endosperm of the kernel.

Corn starch is a common food ingredient, often used to thicken sauces or soups, and to make corn syrup and other sugars. Corn starch is versatile, easily modified, and finds many uses in industry such as adhesives, in paper products, as an anti-sticking agent, and textile manufacturing. It has medical uses as well, such as to supply glucose for people with glycogen storage disease.

Like many products in dust form, it can be hazardous in large quantities due to its flammability—see dust explosion. When mixed with a fluid, corn starch can rearrange itself into a non-Newtonian fluid. For example, adding water transforms corn starch into a material commonly known as oobleck while adding oil transforms corn starch into an electrorheological (ER) fluid. The concept can be explained through the mixture termed "cornflour slime".

== History ==
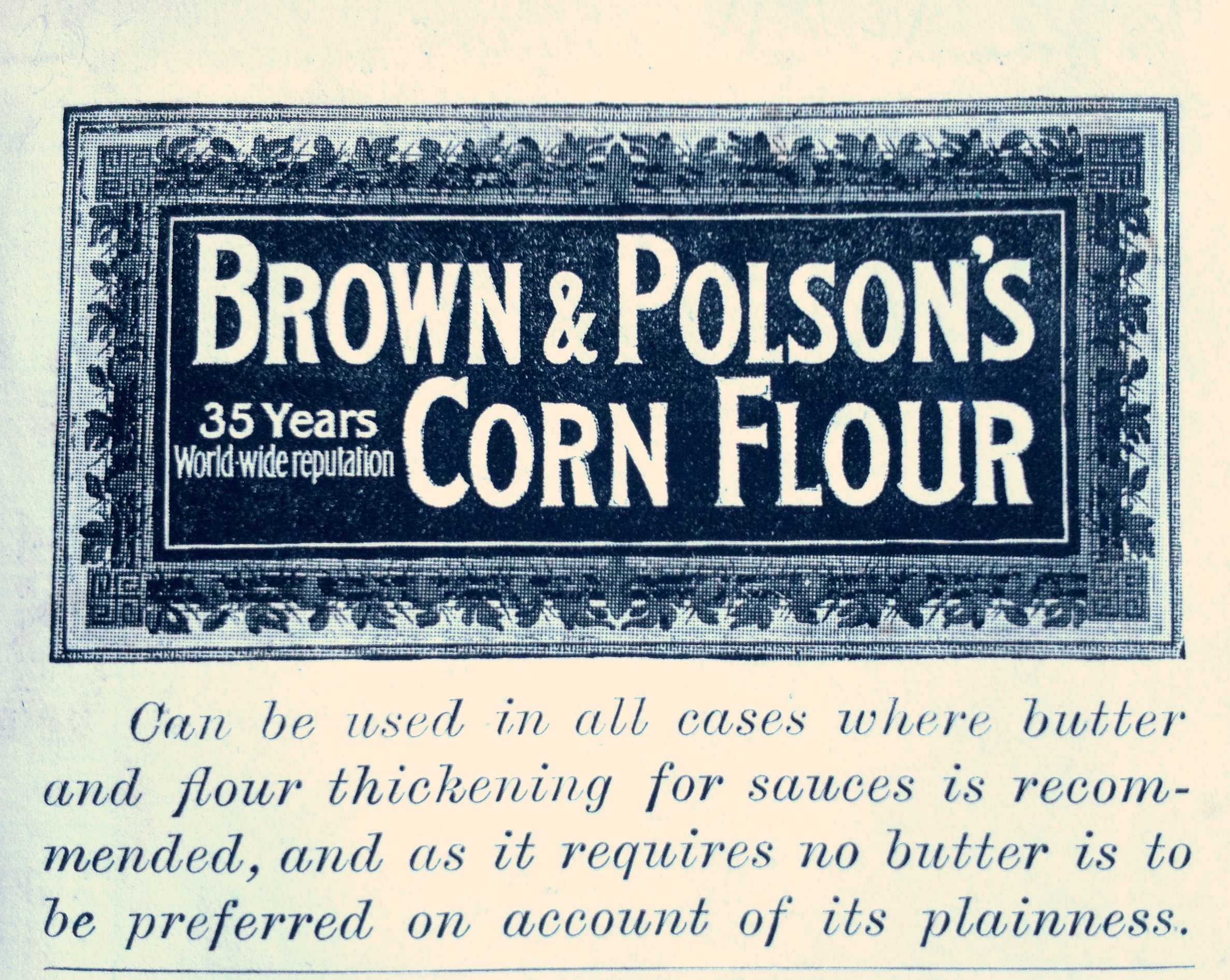
Advertisement for a Cornflour manufacturer, 1894

Until 1851, corn starch was used primarily for starching laundry and for other industrial uses. A method to produce pure culinary starch from maize was patented by John Polson of Brown & Polson, in Paisley, Scotland in 1854. This was sold as "Patented Corn Flour". Brown & Polson were muslin manufacturers who had been producing laundry starch for the Paisley shawl industry and would become the largest starch producers in the UK.

== Uses ==
Although mostly used for cooking and as a household item, corn starch is used for many purposes in several industries, ranging from its use as a chemical additive for certain products, to medical therapy for certain illnesses.

=== Culinary ===
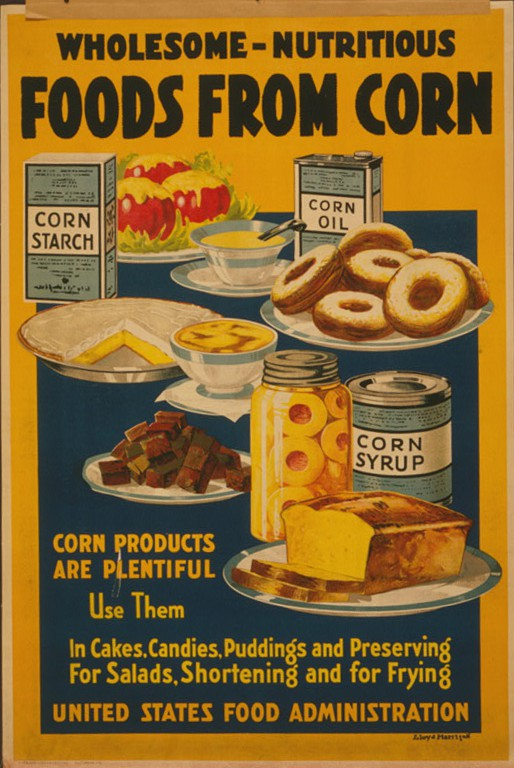
Advertisement by the US Food Administration, 1918, indicating corn starch as "wholesome" and "nutritious"

Corn starch is used as a thickening agent in liquid-based foods (e.g., soup, sauces, gravies, custard), usually by mixing it with a lower-temperature liquid to form a paste or slurry. It is sometimes preferred over flour alone because it forms a translucent, rather than opaque mixture. As the starch is heated over 203 °F (95 °C), the molecular chains unravel, allowing them to collide with other starch chains to form a mesh, thickening the liquid (Starch gelatinization). However, continued boiling breaks up the molecules and thins the liquid.

Cornstarch is usually included as an anticaking agent in powdered sugar (icing or confectioner's sugar).

A common substitute is arrowroot starch, which replaces the same amount of corn starch.

Food producers reduce production costs by adding varying amounts of corn starch to foods, for example to cheese and yogurt.

Chicken nuggets with a thin outer layer of corn starch allow increased oil absorption and crispness after the latter stages of frying.

=== Non-culinary ===
Baby powder may include corn starch among its ingredients. Corn starch can be used to manufacture bioplastics (like PLA used for 3D printing) and may be used in the manufacture of airbags.

Adhesive can be made from corn starch, traditionally one of the adhesives that may be used to make paste papers. It dries with a slight sheen compared to wheat starch. It may also be used as an adhesive in book and paper conservation.

Corn starch can also be mixed with salt to make salt ceramic, a craft material.

=== Medical ===
Corn starch is the preferred anti-stick agent on medical products made from natural latex, including condoms, diaphragms, and medical gloves.

Corn starch has properties enabling supply of glucose to maintain blood sugar levels for people with glycogen storage disease. Corn starch can be used starting at age 6–12 months allowing glucose fluctuations to be deterred.

== Manufacture ==
The corn is steeped for 30 to 48 hours, which ferments it slightly. The germ is separated from the endosperm and those two components are ground separately (still soaked). Next the starch is removed from each by washing. The starch is separated from the corn steep liquor, the cereal germ, the fibers and the corn gluten mostly in hydrocyclones and centrifuges, and then dried. (The residue from every stage is used in animal feed and to make corn oil or other applications.) This process is called wet milling. Finally, the starch may be modified for specific purposes.

== Risks ==
Like many other powders, corn starch is susceptible to dust explosions. It is believed that overheating of a corn starch-based powder—despite warnings on the packaging indicating that the material is flammable—initiated the Formosa Fun Coast explosion in Taiwan on 27 June 2015.

== Names and varieties ==
- Called corn starch in the United States and Canada. The term corn flour refers to cornmeal that is very finely milled; or, after wet processing with alkali, further grinding then drying, masa flour.
- It is called cornflour in the United Kingdom, Ireland, and some Commonwealth countries. Distinct in these countries from cornmeal.
- Cornflour is commonly derived from wheat in Australia. The starch is extracted from the wheat kernel, and is sometimes referred to as 'wheaten cornflour'.

== See also ==
- Amylomaize, high amylose starch
- Bird's Custard, the English custard based on cornflour, invented in 1837
- Waxy corn, waxy maize starch
- Corn sauce
- Corn syrup
- Corn ethanol
- Modified starch
- Potato starch
- Semolina
- Tapioca starch
