= Salt ceramic =

Traditional salt-based modeling medium

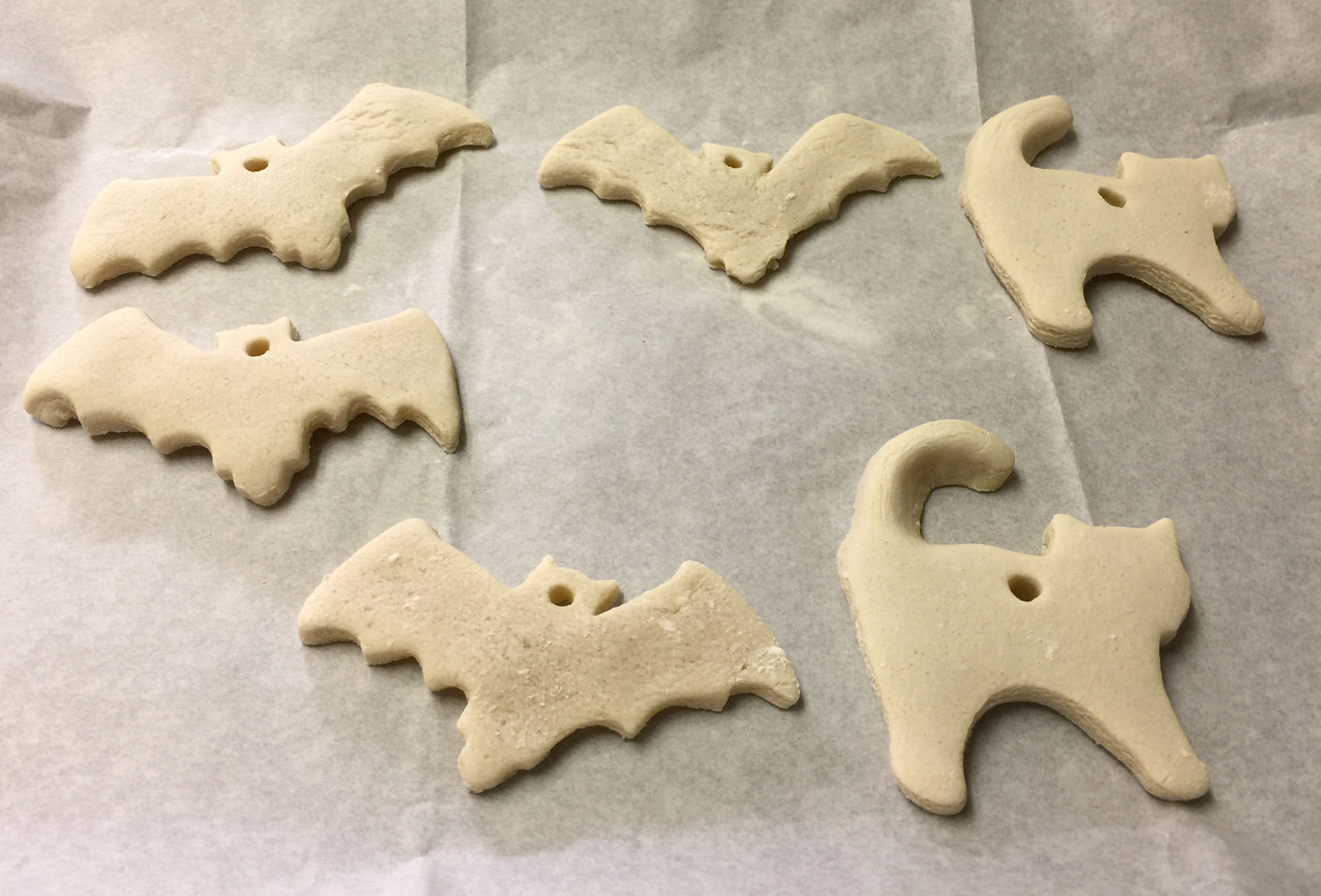
Salt ceramic ornaments, drying

Salt ceramic, also called Victorian salt clay, is a traditional salt-based modeling medium made by mixing corn starch and table salt.

== Composition ==
It is an air-dry modeling clay, which is commonly made in the kitchen by combining one part corn starch with two parts table salt and heated and stirred till it stiffens to a dough-like consistency. It is then placed on wax paper to cool before kneading.

The clay is naturally white, but is often colored by mixing in food color or paint after kneading.

== Techniques ==
Salt ceramic dries to a coarse stone-like texture, and so is often used in folk craft and children's art. Like other air-dried modeling compounds, it is not suitable for vessels that will contain liquids. It takes about two days for the objects to dry. It is known to take paint well, once hardened. It is often coated with acrylic, once hardened, to protect it from moisture.

Popular uses of salt ceramic include making jewelry and Christmas ornaments.

In jewelry making, it can be rolled into balls and formed into beads, or pressed into various shapes. In making Christmas ornaments it is sometimes made into balls, similar to the bead-making process, or rolled out with a rolling pin and cut with cookie cutters and painted.

== Related modeling media ==
- Cold porcelain is used in a similar way, but is made with white glue in place of the salt and water. It is a popular medium for modeling lifelike flowers.
- Mastic cold porcelain uses bicarbonate of soda rather than salt. It is preferred by some people who do not like to work with salt. Also known as kitchen craft clay, it has been around since at least the 1960s.

== See also ==
- Metal clay
- Play-Doh
- Polymer clay
