= Genetically modified potato =

Potato that has had its genes modified using genetic engineering

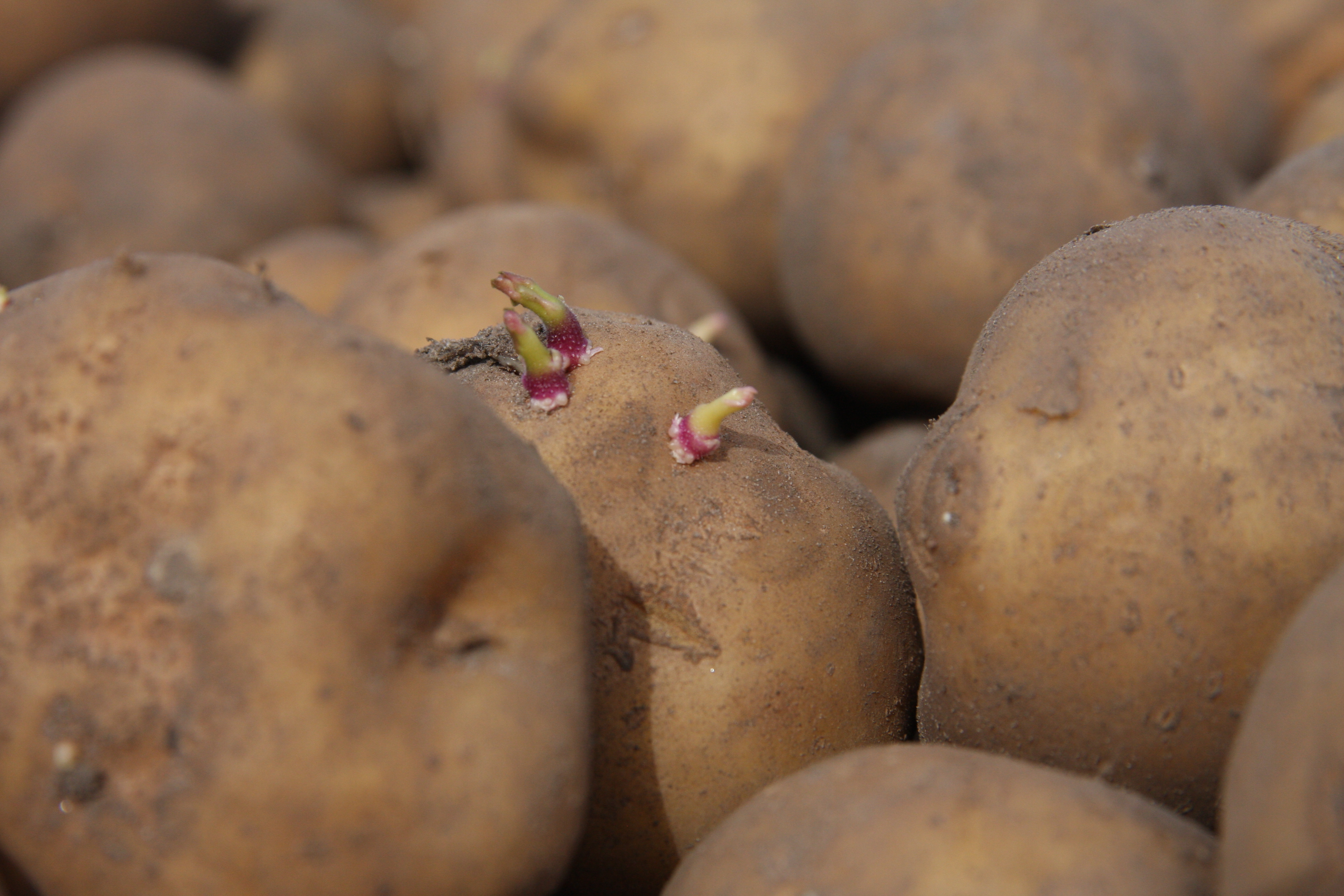
Amflora potatoes, modified to produce pure amylopectin starch

A genetically modified potato is a potato that has had its genes modified. Goals of modification include introducing pest resistance, tweaking the amounts of certain chemicals produced by the plant, and to prevent browning or bruising of the tubers. Varieties modified to produce large amounts of starches may be approved for industrial use only, however, not for food.

== Currently marketed varieties ==
=== Used for food ===
==== Innate ====
The genetically modified Innate potato was approved by the United States Department of Agriculture in 2014 and the US FDA in 2015. The cultivar was developed by J. R. Simplot Company. It is designed to resist blackspot bruising, browning and to contain less of the amino acid asparagine that turns into acrylamide during the frying of potatoes. Acrylamide is a probable human carcinogen, so reduced levels of it in fried potato foods is desirable. Though browning does not affect the quality of the potato, consumers tend to not want to purchase "damaged" or possibly spoiled produce. The 'Innate' name comes from the fact that this variety does not contain any genetic material from other species (the genes used are "innate" to potatoes) and uses RNA interference to switch off genes. Simplot hopes that not including genes from other species will assuage consumer fears about biotechnology.

The "Innate" potato is not a single cultivar; rather, it is a group of potato varieties that have had the same genetic alterations applied using the same process. Five different potato varieties have been transformed, creating "innate" versions of the varieties, with all of the original traits, plus the engineered ones. Ranger Russet, Russet Burbank, and Atlantic potatoes have all been transformed by Simplot, as well as two proprietary varieties. Modifications of each variety involved two transformations, one for each of the two new traits. Thus there was a total of ten transformation events in developing the different Innate varieties.

McDonald's is a major consumer of potatoes in the US. The Food and Water Watch has petitioned the company to reject the newly marketed Innate potatoes. McDonald's has announced that they have ruled out using Innate.

== Previously marketed varieties ==
=== NewLeaf ===
In 1995, Monsanto introduced the NewLeaf variety of potato which was their first genetically modified crop. It was designed to resist attack from the Colorado potato beetle due to the insertion of Bt toxin producing genes from the bacterium Bacillus thuringiensis. The insect-resistant potatoes found only a small market, and Monsanto discontinued the sale of seed in 2001.

=== Used in industry ===
==== Amflora ====
'Amflora' (also known as EH92-527-1) was a cultivar developed by BASF Plant Science for production of pure amylopectin starch for processing into waxy potato starch. It was approved for industrial applications in the European Union market on 2 March 2010 by the European Commission, but was withdrawn from the EU market in January 2012 due to a lack of acceptance from farmers and consumers.

== Unmarketed varieties ==
A modified Désirée potato was developed in the 1990s by biochemist John Gatehouse at Cambridge Agricultural Genetics (later renamed Axis Genetics) and had gone through two years of field trials at Rothamsted Experimental Station. The potatoes were modified to express the Galanthus nivalis agglutinin (GNA) gene from the Galanthus (snowdrop) plant, which caused them to produce GNA lectin protein that is toxic to some insects. This variety of potatoes is the one which was involved in the Pusztai affair.

Other similar research - into transgenic Désirées, with antifeedant chemicals transferred from other plants, a few years before, with a researcher from Axis - was also done by a team including Gatehouse and his wife Angharad. At this time the Gatehouses were both at the University of Durham.

In 2014, a team of British scientists published a paper about three-year field trial showing that another genetically modified version of the Désirée cultivar can resist infection after exposure to late blight, one of the most serious diseases of potatoes. They developed this potato for blight resistance by inserting a gene (Rpi-vnt1.1), into the DNA of Désirée potatoes. This gene, which conferred the resistance to blight, was isolated from a wild relative of potatoes, Solanum venturii, which is a native of South America.

In 2017 scientists in Bangladesh developed their own variety of blight resistant GM potato.
