= Kriton Arsenis =

Greek politician

Kriton Arsenis Κρίτων Αρσένης MEP
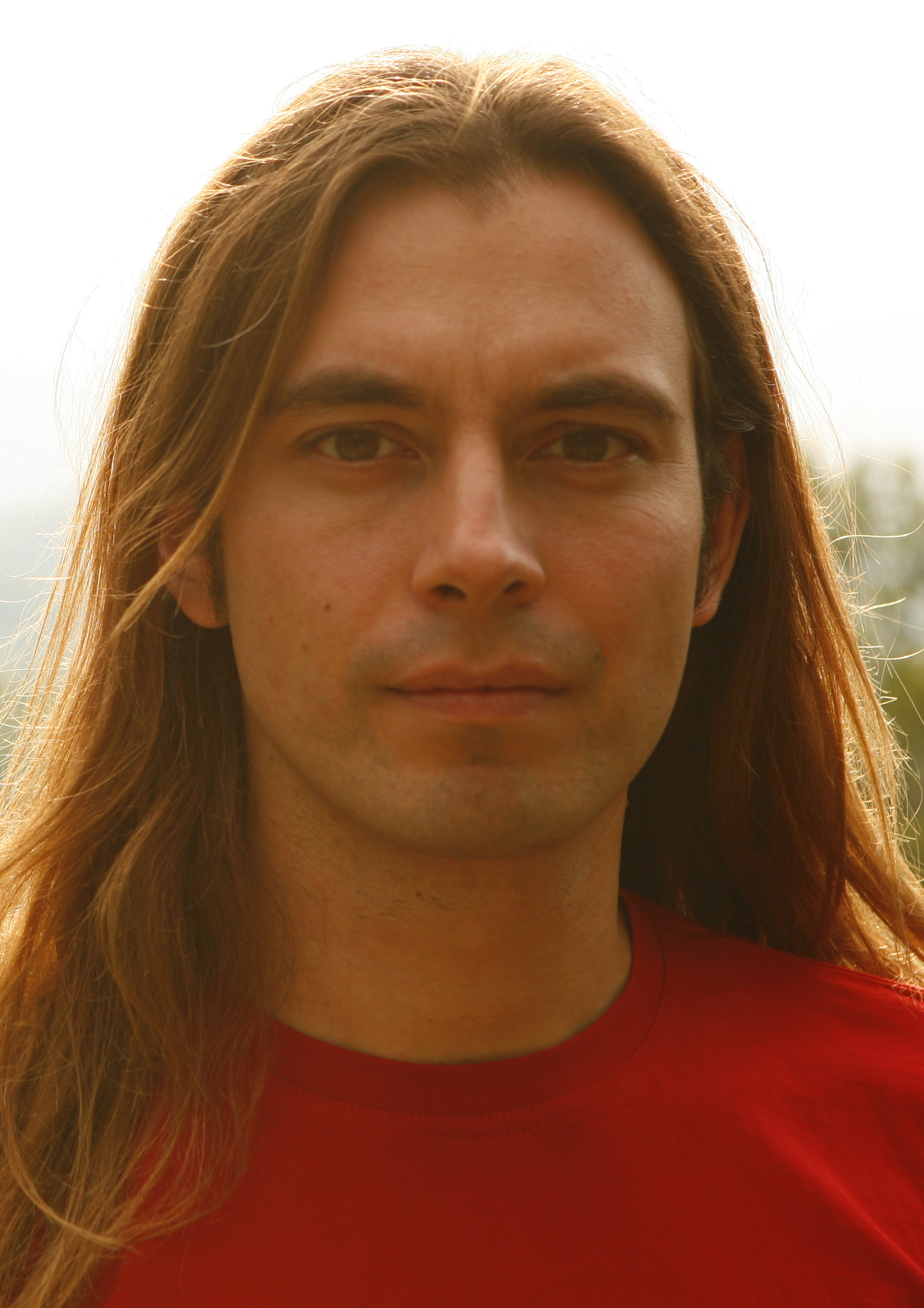

Kriton Arsenis (Greek: Κρίτων Αρσένης, born 3 August 1977) is an environmentalist and a former member of the European Parliament, the Parliamentary Assembly of the Council of Europe and the Greek Parliament.

== Early life ==
He was born in Thessaloniki, Greece. He studied planning and regional development at the University of Thessaly in Greece (1996–2001) and continued on with postgraduate studies in International Development (MPA/ID) at the Kennedy School of Harvard University (2001–2003). From 2005 to 2009, he worked for the Greek NGO ELLINIKI ETAIREIA-Hellenic Society for the Protection of the Environment and the Cultural Heritage, where he was responsible for setting up the "Sustainable Aegean Programme", a public awareness campaign for the sustainable development of the Aegean Islands. From January 2008 to May 2009 he served as a member of the Greek National Planning Council where he represented ten Greek environmental NGOs.

== Political career ==
In June 2009, Kriton Arsenis became a Member of the European Parliament in the S&D. He was recruited to the Panhellenic Socialist Movement (PASOK), by George A. Papandreou, the ex prime minister of Greece, after receiving the European Grand Prize for the “Sustainable Aegean” campaign. In May 2013 he resigned from PASOK expressing his strong opposition to water privatisation. He was a Member of the European Parliament Committee on the Environment, Public Health and Food Safety and the Committee on Fisheries. He was also a substitute Member of the Committee on Development. He was active in issues related to biodiversity and the fight against climate change. He was also instrumental in the European Union Timber Regulation. Likewise, he has been in the front line in the battle to save the bluefin tuna (Thunnus thynnus) in the Mediterranean. He led the Parliament in adopting the EU legislation on monitoring emissions from Land use, land-use change and forestry (LULUCF). On fisheries he introduced the policy of fish stock recovery areas - no take zones which was incorporated into the EU Common Fisheries Policy. He also led the EP in the vote that ended derogation from the implementation of EU legislation on Shark Finning. He drafted and led proposals that were successfully approved by the European Parliament asking for an EU cetacean protection legislation and a ban on bottom trawling of deep sea species in the Atlantic. On biodiversity his amendments led to the rejection of the proposed EU legislation on banning the use of traditional seeds in agriculture and tabled the amendment that successfully ended the derogation from implementation of the EU environmental assessment legislation.

He run for reelection to the European Parliament in 2014, as a non-party affiliated candidate for SYRIZA. He received 112.919 votes, but was not reelected. He was invited to be a candidate for SYRIZA in the national elections in 2015, but declined. After a 5-year hiatus from Greek national politics, he returned as a candidate for the MeRA25 party in the national elections. He was elected and served as a member of parliament until 2023 when MeRA25 did not secure enough votes to enter parliament.

== Activism and awards ==
He has been an active member of the environmental movement in Greece and abroad since the age of 15. In 1998 he was awarded a prize by the Prefecture of Thessaloniki for his contribution to the protection of the Old City (Ano Poli) of Thessaloniki. In 2009, he was awarded by the European Union and Europa Nostra (Network of cultural heritage associate organization from all over Europe) the European Grand Prize in the category "Education, training and awareness-raising" for the campaign "Sustainable Aegean". As part of the awareness raising effort for climate change, he coordinated two Greek "Turn the lights off" initiatives, for 5 minutes in February 2007 and for 10 minutes in June 2007. In September 2010, Kriton Arsenis was voted by members of the European Parliament as the MEP of the Year under the Fisheries Category, a vote organized by the Parliament Magazine. Arsenis was nominated for the award for his work on Bluefin tuna and Marine issues in general, especially on his efforts on Whaling in the buildup to the IWC and the resolution on Iceland's accession to the EU. In June 2011 he was awarded the “Fair Politician of the Year” award, by the Dutch Evert Vermeer Foundation, for fighting for policy coherence for development in the EU legislation. In September 2011, Kriton Arsenis was voted once more as MEP of the Year this time under the special category for the UN International Year of Forests. Later on that year he founded Roadfree, a global initiative for the protection of world's last intact areas from construction of new roads. It succeeded in producing the world's first maps of roadfree areas by Google Earth and the European Environment Agency, which were presented in 2012 at the UN Rio+20 Earth Summit. Updated versions of these maps were presented to other global summits and events including UNCBD COP11 and UNFCCC COP 19.
