= NDP-glucose—starch glucosyltransferase =

Class of enzymes

NDP-glucose-starch glucosyltransferase

Identifiers
- EC no.: 2.4.1.242

Databases
- IntEnz: IntEnz view
- BRENDA: BRENDA entry
- ExPASy: NiceZyme view
- KEGG: KEGG entry
- MetaCyc: metabolic pathway
- PRIAM: profile
- PDB structures: RCSB PDB PDBe PDBsum
Search
- PMC: articles
- PubMed: articles
- NCBI: proteins

In enzymology, a NDP-glucose—starch glucosyltransferase (EC 2.4.1.242) is an enzyme that catalyzes the chemical reaction

NDP-glucose + (1,4-alpha-D-glucosyl)n $\rightleftharpoons$ NDP + (1,4-alpha-D-glucosyl)n^{+}1

Thus, the two substrates of this enzyme are NDP-glucose and (1,4-alpha-D-glucosyl)n, whereas its two products are NDP and (1,4-alpha-D-glucosyl)n+1.

This enzyme belongs to the family of glycosyltransferases, specifically the hexosyltransferases. The systematic name of this enzyme class is NDP-glucose:1,4-alpha-D-glucan 4-alpha-D-glucosyltransferase. Other names in common use include granule-bound starch synthase, starch synthase II (ambiguous), waxy protein, starch granule-bound nucleoside diphosphate glucose-starch, glucosyltransferase, granule-bound starch synthase I, GBSSI, granule-bound starch synthase II, GBSSII, GBSS, and NDPglucose-starch glucosyltransferase.
