= Amylopectin =

Identifiers
CAS Number	9037-22-3
ChemSpider	None
EC Number	232-911-6
KEGG	C00317
PubChem CID	439207
UNII	4XO4QFV777
CompTox Dashboard (EPA)	DTXSID1093880

Properties
Chemical formula	[C_{6}H_{10}O_{5}]n
Molar mass	Variable
Appearance	White powder
Solubility in water	Insoluble
- Except where otherwise noted, data are given for materials in their standard state (at 25 °C [77 °F], 100 kPa). verify (what is ?) Infobox references

Amylopectin /ˌæmɪloʊˈpɛktɪn/ is a water-insoluble polysaccharide and highly branched polymer of α-glucose units found in plants. It is one of the two components of starch, the other being amylose.

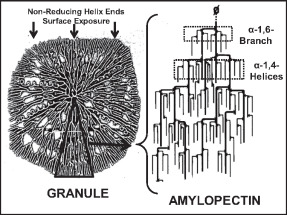
Relation of amylopectin to starch granule

Plants store starch within specialized organelles called amyloplasts. To generate energy, the plant hydrolyzes the starch, releasing the glucose subunits. Humans and other animals that eat plant foods also use amylase, an enzyme that assists in breaking down amylopectin, to initiate the hydrolysis of starch.

Starch is made of about 70–80% amylopectin by weight, though it varies depending on the source. For example, it ranges from lower percent content in long-grain rice, amylomaize, and russet potatoes to 100% in glutinous rice, waxy potato starch, and waxy corn. Amylopectin is highly branched, being formed of 2,000 to 200,000 glucose units. Its inner chains are formed of 20–24 glucose subunits.

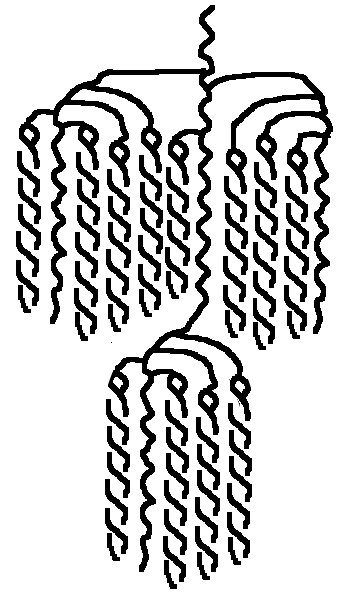
Structure of the amylopectin molecule

Dissolved amylopectin starch has a lower tendency of retrogradation (a partial recrystallization after cooking—a part of the staling process) during storage and cooling. For this main reason, the waxy starches are used in different applications mainly as a thickening agent or stabilizer.

== Structure ==
Amylopectin is a key component in the crystallization of starch's final configuration, accounting for 70-80% of the final mass. Composed of α-glucose, it is formed in plants as a primary measure of energy storage in tandem with this structural metric.

Amylopectin bears a straight/linear chain along with a number of side chains which may be branched further. Glucose units are linked in a linear way with α(1→4) glycosidic bonds. Branching usually occurs at intervals of 25 residues. At the places of origin of a side chain, the branching that takes place bears an α(1→6) glycosidic bond, resulting in a soluble molecule that can be quickly degraded as it has many end points onto which enzymes can attach. Wolform and Thompson (1956) have also reported α(1→3)linkages in case of amylopectin. Amylopectin contains a larger number of glucose units (2000 to 200,000) as compared to amylose containing 200 to 1000 α-glucose units. In contrast, amylose contains very few α(1→6) bonds, or even none at all. This causes amylose to be hydrolyzed more slowly, but also creates higher density and insolubility.

Amylopectin is divided into A and B helical chains of α-glucose. A chains are chains that carry no other chains, resulting in an eventual terminus, whereas B chains are chains that do carry other chains, perpetuating the amylopectin polymer. The ratio between these is usually between 0.8 and 1.4.

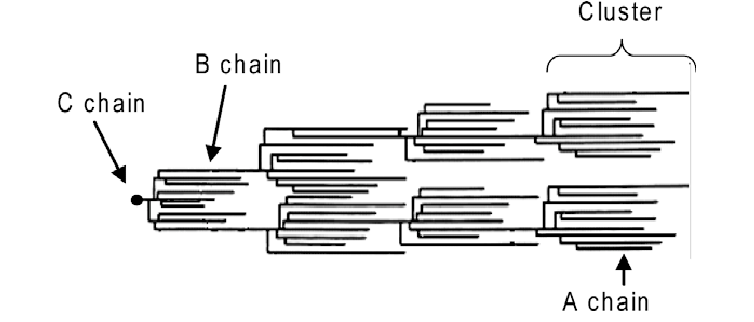
Cluster model of amylopectin

The formation of chain structures has a direct impact on the overall strength of the whole polymer; the longer a chain is, the more differing the effects amylopectin will have on starch's morphology. Packing of chains, inter block chain length (IB-CL), also correlates with the gelatinization temperature of starch granules. In tandem, the IB-CL will increase as the length of B chains increases, meaning that as the length of individual B chains increases, so does the blocks between connections with other chains. Finally, in general, the more densely packed the resulting molecule of amylopectin, the higher the strength of the starch gel as a whole unit.

Starch utilizes the density-strength correlation of amylopectin as a measure of forming dense, strong bricks as a basis for the final starch configuration. Amylopectin in starch is formed into helices to compose hexagonal structures that will subsequently be differentiated into A (cereal) and B (high-amylose; tubular) type starch. Structurally, A is more compact, while B is looser, hence the higher concentration of amylose.

== History ==
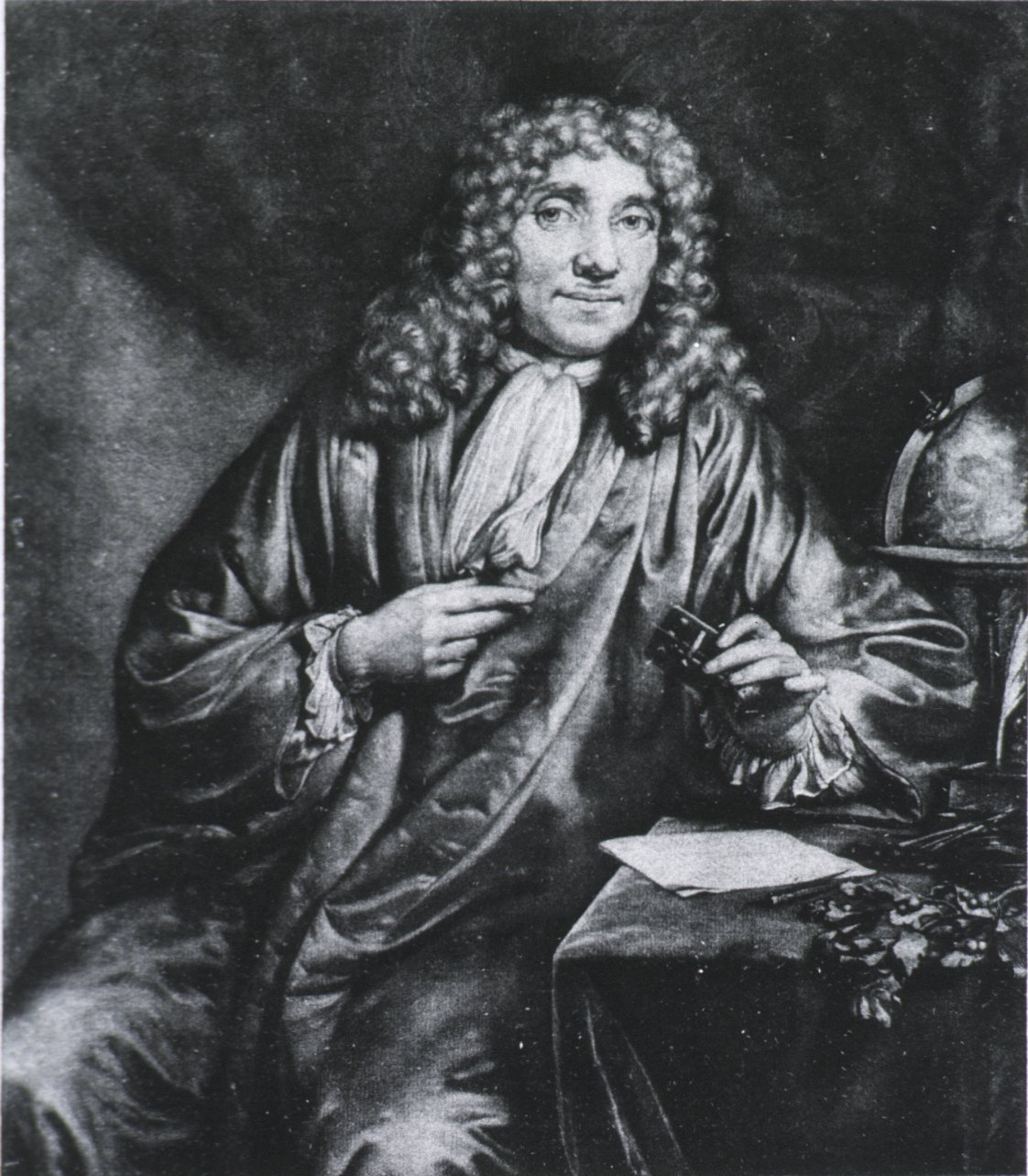
Antonie van Leeuwenhoek

The categorization of amylopectin began with the first observation in starch in 1716 by Antonie van Leeuwenhoek, where he differentiated starch into two fundamental structural components.

The terms amylose and amylopectin were not coined until 1906, by French researchers Maquenee and Roux in the course of an examination of starch, where they explained variations in the properties of starches according to the mixture of these related substances and variable saccharification by malt extract. Since then and through the 1940s, research focused on various methods of separation, like fractional precipitation or enzymatically. This gave rise to the Meyer definition of amylose and "reserv[ing] the name amylopectin to carbohydrates that are branched molecule, degraded by b-amylase only to the stage of residual dextrin". Meyer also proposed the tree like structure model for amylopectin.

The currently accepted structural model was proposed in 1972, based on the cluster organization of double helical structures. Other models have been proposed since, such as the Bertoft BB model, or building block and backbone model in 2012. This model claims short chains are the structural building blocks and long chains the backbone to carry the building blocks, and that the different lengths of chain are separated by their position and direction of elongation.

== Metabolism ==
Both the formation and degradation of amylopectin is important to the metabolic processes of organisms. Amylopectin is one of the two dominant components of starch, and starch is a successful storage molecule for energy. Because of this, it is synthesized and broken down in most plants and cyanobacteria. In fact, amylopectin seems to rival glycogen, the energy storage molecule in animals, because it is able to store more glucose units and henceforth more energy.

The synthesis of amylopectin depends on the combined efforts of four different enzymes:

1. ADP glucose pyrophosphorylase (AGPase)
2. soluble starch synthase (SS)
3. starch branching enzyme (BE)
4. starch debranching enzyme (DBE)

Amylopectin is synthesized by the linkage of α(1→4) glycosidic bonds. The extensive branching of amylopectin (α(1→6) glycosidic bond) is initiated by BE and this is what differentiates amylose from amylopectin. DBE is also needed during this synthesis process to regulate the distribution of these branches.

The breakdown of amylopectin has been studied in context with the breakdown of starch in animals and humans. Starch is mostly composed of amylopectin and amylose, but amylopectin has been shown to degrade more easily. The reason is most likely because amylopectin is highly branched and these branches are more available to digestive enzymes. In contrast, amylose tends to form helices and contain hydrogen bonding.

The breakdown of starch is dependent on three enzymes, among others:

1. alpha, beta amylases
2. phosphorylases
3. starch debranching enzyme (DBE)

There are enzymes that are involved in the synthesis and degradation of amylopectin that have isoforms that display different relationships with proteins and other enzymes. For example, there are many versions of SS (starch synthase). Even the third isoform (SS-III) has two different versions. It is believed that SS-I and SS-II both have a role in elongating the chains of amylopectin branches. SS-IV is also thought to be responsible for the leaf-like structure of starch granule clusters.

== Applications ==
=== Food ===
Amylopectin is the most common carbohydrate in the human diet and is contained in many staple foods. The major sources of amylopectin of starch intake worldwide are the cereals such as rice, wheat, and maize, and the root vegetables potatoes and cassava. Upon cooking, amylopectin in the starch is transformed into readily accessible glucose chains with very different nutritional and functional properties. During cooking with high heat, sugars released from amylopectin can react with amino acids via the Maillard reaction, forming advanced glycation end-products (AGEs), contributing aromas, flavors and texture to foods.

The amylose/amylopectin ratio, molecular weight and molecular fine structure influences the physicochemical properties as well as energy release of different types of starches, which affects the number of calories people consume from food. Amylopectin is also sometimes used as a workout supplement due to this caloric density and a correlation with muscle protein synthesis.

Industrially, amylopectin is used as a stabilizer and thickener, such as corn starch. Amylopectin has also been widely used for the development of edible coating films because of its abundance, cost-effectiveness, and excellent film-forming abilities. Amylopectin-based films have good optical, organoleptic and gas barrier properties, however, they have poor mechanical properties. Many attempts have been made to overcome these limitations, such as the addition of co-biopolymers or other secondary additives to improve the mechanical and tensile properties of the films. Properties of the amylopectin-based films can be influenced by many factors, including types of starch, temperature and time during film formation, plasticizers, co-biopolymers, and storage conditions.

=== Textiles ===
Historically, there is a long established use of starch in sizing applications for textiles. As a component of starch, amylopectin is responsible for the retrogradation or crystalline reordering of the starch, which adds rigidity.

This stiffening effect is used for several textile industry processes, such as printing and pressing, to maintain the shape of a fabric over time. Amylopectin is also used as a sizing agent for yarns, to reinforce and protects the fibers from abrasion and breakage during weaving.

=== Engineering ===
Starch and amylopectin are often used in adhesive formulas, and are increasingly examined for further use in construction

== Clinical applications ==
Amylopectin has seen a rise of use in biomedical applications due to its physiological factors, ease of availability, and low cost. Specifically, amylopectin has very advantageous biochemical properties due to its prevalence as a natural polysaccharide. This causes a high sense of biocompatibility with cells and molecules within the body. Amylopectin is also able to biodegrade to a high degree due to its high sense of crosslinking with 1,6 glycosidic bonds. The bonds easily broken down by the body can reduce molecular weight, expose certain regions, and interact certain bonds with clinical factors. Various physical, chemical, and enzymatic methods of modification have also been researched for amylopectin. These, generally, allow for enhanced and controllable properties which can be selected for the field of research performed. Amylopectin's main role, clinically, is within its integration in starch. Function and structure of amylopectin is based on its integration with amylose and other bounded molecules. Separating these molecules and isolated amylopectin is quite difficult for researchers to perform.

=== Drug delivery ===
Drug delivery refers to technology used to present a drug to a pre-determined region of the body for drug emission and absorption. Principles relating to route of administration, metabolism, site of specific targeting, and toxicity are most important within this field. Drugs administered orally (through mouth) are usually encapsulated in some structure in order to protect the drug from immune and biological responses. These structures aim to keep the drug intact until its site of action and release it at a correct dosage when exposed to a specific marker. Corn and potato starch are often used for this as they contain 60-80% amylopectin. They are mostly used in solid preparations: powders, granules, capsules, and tablets. As a natural polysaccharide, it has a compatible nature with anatomical structures and molecules. This prevents any sort of negative immune response, which is a highly controversial topic in drug delivery. Biodegradability of starch allows it to keep the drug intact until reaching its site of action. This allows the drug to avoid low pH situations such as the digestive system. Native starch can also be modified in physical, chemical, and enzymatic ways to improve mechanical or biochemical properties. Within drug delivery, physical modification include treatment under mechanical forces, heat, or pressure. Chemical modifications attempt to alter molecular structure which can include breaking or addition of bonds. Treating starch with enzymes can allow for increased water solubility.

=== Tissue engineering ===
Tissue engineering aims to generate functional constructs which could replace or improve damaged or infected tissues or whole organs. Many of these constructs lead to infected tissue around the implant area. Coating these materials in amylopectin allows reduction in this infectious reaction. Since amylopectin is mainly used as a coating around these constructs in as it prevents following immune reactions. Since amylopectin is derived directly from a natural polysaccharide, it integrates well with tissues and cells. However, mechanical properties of amylopectin are not optimal due to its high level of crosslinking. This can be avoided by the formation of amylopectin fibers or by forming a nanocomposite with another more rigid polymer.

==== Fibers ====
Amylopectin-based fibers have been fabricated mainly by blending native or modified starches with polymers, plasticizers, cross-linkers, or other additives. Most amylopectin-based fibers are fabricated by electro-wet-spinning, however, the method is demonstrated to be suitable for starches with amylopectin content below 65% and sensitive to amylopectin content of starches. Electrospinning allows for amylopectin to coagulate and form a filament. Fibrous starches induce a more dense material, which can optimize the mechanical properties of starch. Fibers in biomaterials can be used for bone tissue engineering as suitable environment for bone tissue repair and regeneration. Natural bone is a complex composite material composed of an extracellular matrix of mineralized fibers containing living cells and bioactive molecules. Consequently, the use of fibers in biomaterial-based scaffolds offers a wide variety of opportunities to replicate the functional performance of bone. In the last decade, fiber-based techniques such as weaving, knitting, braiding, as well as electrospinning, and direct writing have emerged as promising platforms for making 3D tissue constructs.

==== Bionanocomposites ====
Nanoscience and nanotechnology have been emerging as a technology for the development of various hybrid and composite materials for biomedical applications. When nanomaterials are used for the development of the composites in biology, they are called bionanocomposites. Bionanocomposites have been used in tissue engineering to replace, support, or regenerate the cells, organs, or parts of human entity such that it can function as normal.

Amylopectin-based bionanocomposites are another important class of bionanomaterials, which are biodegradable, with higher mechanical properties, optical transparency, thermal stability, and barrier properties than thermoplastic starch. In conjunction with other nanomaterials like cellulose nanocrystals, nano-ZnO, nanoclay, biodegradable synthetic polymers, starch is one of the most popular materials for the preparation of bionanocomposites for various biomedical applications such as controlled drug release, scaffold for tissue engineering, and cement for bone regeneration. Amylopectin is usually combined with a synthetic polymer with higher elastic modulus and yield strength. This allows for starch to withstand the higher fluid flow and mechanical forces prevalent in bone, cardiac, and endothelial tissue.

== See also ==
- Glycogenosis type IV
- Amflora, a genetically modified potato high in amylopectin (low in amylose) with a high glycemic index
- Waxy corn, a Chinese maize with almost all amylopectin and trace amounts of amylose, different from normal corn whose endosperm contains 25% amylose
