= Amylose =

Names
- IUPAC name (1→4)-α-D-Glucopyranan

Identifiers
CAS Number	9005-82-7
ChEBI	CHEBI:28102
ChemSpider	None
ECHA InfoCard	100.029.702
UNII	7TDQ74Y18L
CompTox Dashboard (EPA)	DTXSID8093813

Properties
Chemical formula	Variable
Molar mass	Variable
Appearance	White powder
Solubility in water	Insoluble

Hazards
NFPA 704 (fire diamond)	1 1 0
- Except where otherwise noted, data are given for materials in their standard state (at 25 °C [77 °F], 100 kPa). verify (what is ?) Infobox references

Amylose is a polysaccharide made of α-D-glucose units, bonded to each other through α(1→4) glycosidic bonds. Together with amylopectin, it is one of the two components of starch, making up approximately 20–25% of it. Because of its tightly packed helical structure, amylose is more resistant to digestion than other starch molecules and is therefore an important form of resistant starch.

== Structure ==
Amylose A is a parallel double-helix of linear chains of glucose

Amylose is made up of α(1→4) bound glucose molecules. The carbon atoms on glucose are numbered, starting at the aldehyde (C=O) carbon, so, in amylose, the 1-carbon on one glucose molecule is linked to the 4-carbon on the next glucose molecule (α(1→4) bonds). The structural formula of amylose is pictured at right. The number of repeated glucose subunits (n) is usually in the range of 300 to 3000, but can be many thousands.

There are three main forms of amylose chains can take. It can exist in a disordered amorphous conformation, found both in starch granules and in hydrated amylose (when starch is cooked in water). There are also two different helical forms. Starting with purified amylose, it can bind with another amylose molecule in a double helix (A or B form), or it can bind with a guest molecule such as iodine, a fatty acid, or an aromatic compound, known as the V form. Within this form, there are many different variations. Each is notated with V and then a subscript indicating the number of glucose units per turn. The most common is the V_{6} form, which has six glucose units a turn. V_{8} and possibly V_{7} forms exist as well. These provide an even larger space for the guest molecule to bind.

This linear structure can have some rotation around the phi and psi angles, but for the most part bound glucose ring oxygens lie on one side of the structure. The α(1→4) structure promotes the formation of a helix structure, making it possible for hydrogen bonds to form between the oxygen atoms bound at the 2-carbon of one glucose molecule and the 3-carbon of the next glucose molecule.

Fiber X-ray diffraction analysis coupled with computer-based structure refinement has found A-, B-, and C- polymorphs of amylose. Each form corresponds to either the A-, the B-, or the C- starch forms. A- and B- structures have different helical crystal structures and water contents, whereas the C- structure is a mixture of A- and B- unit cells, resulting in an intermediate packing density between the two forms.

== Physical properties ==
High-amylose forms of starch make it more resistant to digestion. Amylose is soluble in hot water. It also reduces the crystallinity of amylopectin and how easily water can infiltrate the starch. The higher the amylose content, the less expansion potential and the lower the gel strength for the same starch concentration. This can be countered partially by increasing the granule size.

== Function ==
Amylose is important in plant energy storage. It is less readily digested than amylopectin. It makes up about 30% of the stored starch in plants, though the percentage varies by species and variety. The digestive enzyme α-amylase breaks down starch molecules into maltotriose and maltose, which can be used as sources of energy.

Amylose is also an important thickener, water binder, emulsion stabilizer, and gelling agent in industrial and food-based contexts. Loose helical amylose chains have a hydrophobic interior that can bind to hydrophobic molecules such as lipids and aromatic compounds. The one problem with this is that, when it crystallizes or associates, it can lose some stability, often releasing water in the process (syneresis). When amylose concentration is increased, gel stickiness decreases but firmness increases. When other things, including amylopectin, bind to amylose, the viscosity can be affected, but incorporating κ-carrageenan, alginate, xanthan gum, or low-molecular-weight sugars can reduce the loss in stability. The ability to bind water can add substance to food, possibly serving as a fat replacement. For example, amylose is responsible for causing white sauce to thicken, but, upon cooling, the solid and the water will partly separate. Amylose is known for its good film-forming properties, useful in food packaging. Excellent film-forming behavior of amylose was studied already in 1950s. Amylose films are better for both barrier properties and mechanical properties when compared to the amylopectin films.

In a laboratory setting, it can act as a marker. Iodine molecules fit neatly inside the helical structure of amylose, binding with the starch polymer that absorbs certain known wavelengths of light. Hence, a common test is the iodine test for starch. If starch is mixed with a small amount of yellow iodine solution, a blue-black color will be observed. The intensity of the color can be tested with a colorimeter, using a red filter to discern the concentration of starch present in the solution. It is also possible to use starch as an indicator in titrations involving iodine reduction. It is also used in amylose magnetic beads and resin to separate maltose-binding protein.

== Recent studies ==
High-amylose varieties of rice, the less sticky long-grain rice, have a much lower glycemic load, which could be beneficial for diabetics.

Researchers have identified the granule-bound starch synthase (GBSS) as the enzyme that specifically elongates amylose during starch biosynthesis in plants. The waxy locus in maize encodes for the GBSS protein. Mutants lacking the GBSS protein produce starch containing only amylopectin, such as in waxy corn. In Arabidopsis leaves, another gene, encoding the protein targeting to starch (PTST) protein, is required in addition to GBSS for amylose synthesis. Mutants lacking either protein produce starch without amylose. Genetically modified potato cultivar Amflora by BASF Plant Science was developed to not produce amylose.

== See also ==
- Amflora, genetically modified low-amylose potato (high in amylopectin)
- Amylomaize, high-amylose maize starch
- Russet Burbank potato, high-amylose potato cultivar
