= Waxy potato starch =

Waxy potato starch is a variety of commercially available starch composed almost entirely of amylopectin molecules, extracted from new potato varieties. Standard starch extracted from traditional potato varieties contains both amylose and amylopectin.

Waxy potato starch, when gelatinized, has a clearer film, a stickier paste and retrogradates (thickening of starch film or paste during storage) less compared to regular potato starch. Waxy potato starch derivatives are used in textile sizing and food applications.

Two types of potato plant varieties are developed using different methods: one using traditional breeding techniques and another using genetic manipulation (GMO).

== Amylopectin potato (traditional breeding) ==
Through traditional breeding techniques an amylose-free mutant was obtained without genetic manipulation. Since 2005 the first natural potato variety Eliane is being cultivated and marketed by the starch company AVEBE.

== Amylopectin potato (genetically modified) ==
Genetically modified amylopectin potato varieties have been developed. As genetic engineering is a controversial public opinion topic, commercialisation remains difficult. However, in March 2010, EFSA allowed BASF to commercialized the variety Amflora within the EU. A point of criticism of GMOs is the use of genetic engineering techniques to imprecisely perform horizontal gene transfer. For the GM-amylopectin potato only potato DNA from other cultivars is transferred in as a transgene. Some organizations call genetic modification, using foreign, but related transgenes cisgenesis.

In the beginning of 2013 BASF stop all activities on Amflora in EU due to 'uncertainty in the regulatory environment and threats of field destructions'.

== Waxy potato varieties ==
The term "waxy potato" refers also to potato varieties which stay firm after cooking and retain their shape (boiling potato). Waxy potatoes have lower starch content (16-18%) than floury potatoes.
