= Starch gelatinization =

Process of breaking down the intermolecular bonds of starch by water

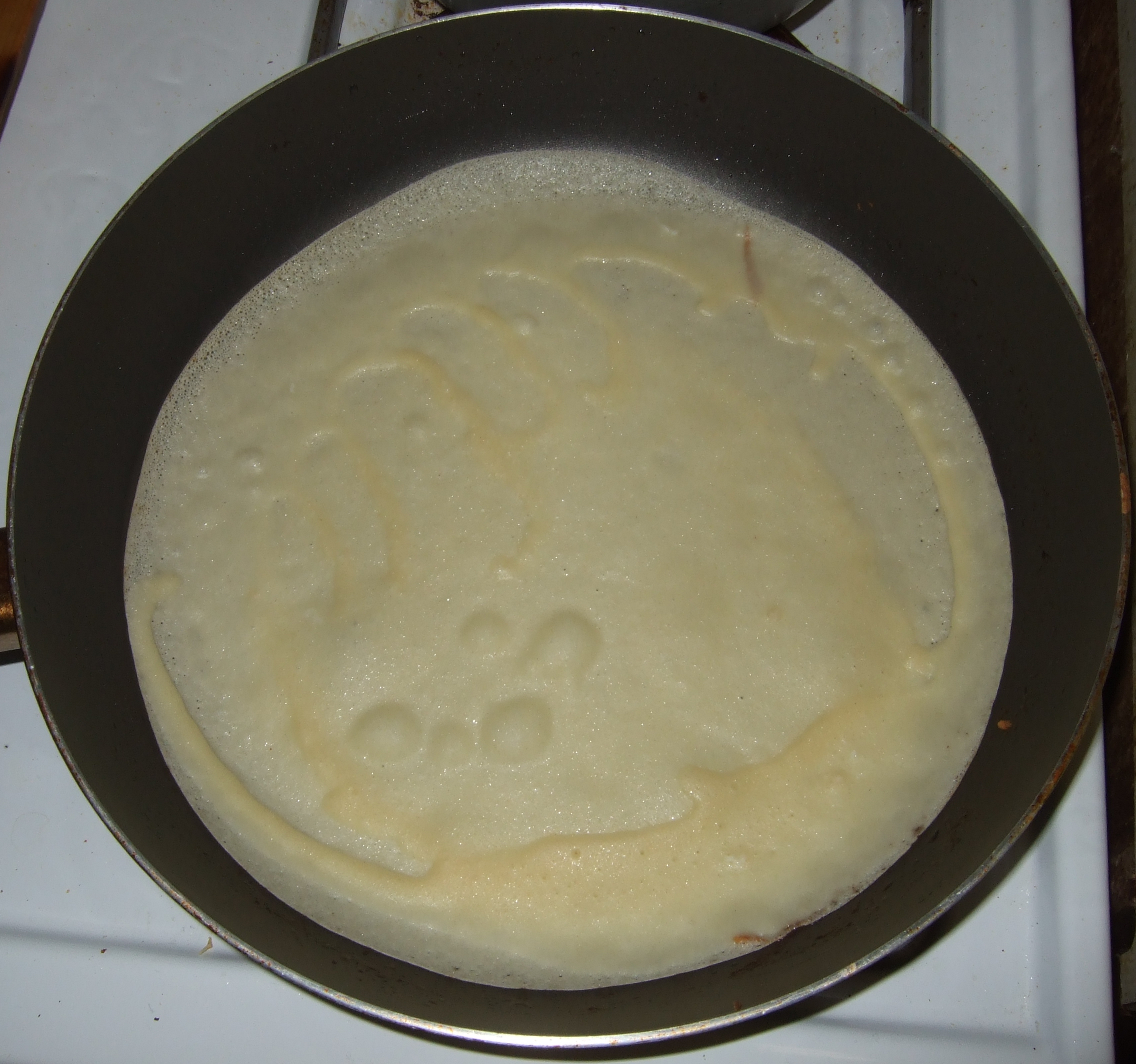
A crepe being cooked

Starch gelatinization is a process of breaking down of intermolecular bonds of starch molecules in the presence of water and heat, allowing the hydrogen bonding sites (the hydroxyl hydrogen and oxygen) to engage more water. This irreversibly dissolves the starch granule in water. Water acts as a plasticizer.

== Process ==
Three main processes happen to the starch granule: granule swelling, crystallite and double-helical melting, and amylose leaching.

- Granule swelling: During heating, water is first absorbed in the amorphous space of starch, which leads to a swelling phenomenon.
- Melting of double helical structures: Water then enters via amorphous regions into the tightly bound areas of double helical structures of amylopectin. At ambient temperatures these crystalline regions do not allow water to enter. Heat causes such regions to become diffuse, the amylose chains begin to dissolve, to separate into an amorphous form and the number and size of crystalline regions decreases. Under the microscope in polarized light starch loses its birefringence and its extinction cross.
- Amylose leaching: Penetration of water thus increases the randomness in the starch granule structure, and causes swelling; eventually amylose molecules leach into the surrounding water and the granule structure disintegrates.

The gelatinization temperature of starch depends upon plant type and the amount of water present, pH, types and concentration of salt, sugar, fat and protein in the recipe, as well as starch derivatisation technology are used. Some types of unmodified native starches start swelling at 55 °C (131 °F), other types at 85 °C (185 °F). The gelatinization temperature of modified starch depends on, for example, the degree of cross-linking, acid treatment, or acetylation.

Gel temperature can also be modified by genetic manipulation of starch synthase genes. Gelatinization temperature also depends on the amount of damaged starch granules; these will swell faster. Damaged starch can be produced, for example, during the wheat milling process, or when drying the starch cake in a starch plant. There is an inverse correlation between gelatinization temperature and glycemic index. High amylose starches require more energy to break up bonds to gelatinize into starch molecules.

Gelatinization improves the availability of starch for amylase hydrolysis. So gelatinization of starch is often used in cooking to make the starch digestible or to thicken/bind water in roux, sauce, or soup.

== Retrogradation ==
Gelatinized starch, when cooled for a long enough period (hours or days), will thicken (or gel) and rearrange itself again to a more crystalline structure; this process is called retrogradation. During cooling, starch molecules gradually aggregate to form a gel. The following molecular associations can occur: amylose-amylose, amylose-amylopectin, and amylopectin-amylopectin. A mild association amongst chains come together with water still embedded in the molecule network.

Due to strong associations of hydrogen bonding, longer amylose molecules (and starch which has a higher amylose content) will form a stiff gel. Amylopectin molecules with longer branched structure, which makes them more similar to amylose, increases the tendency to form strong gels. High amylopectin starches will have a stable gel, but will be softer than high amylose gels.

Retrogradation restricts the availability for amylase hydrolysis to occur, which reduces the digestibility of the starch.

== Pregelatinized starch ==
Pregelatinized starch (dextrin) is starch which has been cooked and then dried, on a drum dryer or in an extruder, making the starch cold-water-soluble. Spray dryers are used to obtain dry starch sugars and low-viscosity pregelatinized starch powder.

== Determination ==
A simple technique to study starch gelation is by using a Brabender Viscoamylograph. It is a common technique used by food industries to determine the pasting temperature, swelling capacity, shear/thermal stability, and the extent of retrogradation. Under controlled conditions, starch and distilled water is heated at a constant heating rate in a rotating bowl and then cooled down. The viscosity of the mixture deflects a measuring sensor in the bowl. This deflection is measured as viscosity in torque over time vs. temperature and recorded on the computer. The viscoamylograph allows us to observe: the beginning of gelatinization, gelatinization maximum, gelatinization temperature, viscosity during holding, and viscosity at the end of cooling.

Differential scanning calorimetry (DSC) is another method industries use to examine properties of gelatinized starch. As water is heated with starch granules, gelatinization occurs, involving an endothermic reaction.

The initiation of gelatinization is called the T-onset. T-peak is the position where the endothermic reaction occurs at the maximum. T-conclusion is when all the starch granules are fully gelatinized and the curve remains stable.

== See also ==
- Dextrin
