= Splenda =

Brand of sugar substitute

- Product type: Sugar substitute
- Current owner: Heartland Food Products Group
- Country: United States
- Introduced: 1999; 27 years ago
- Website: www.splenda.com www.splenda.co.uk www.splenda.ca

Splenda (/ˈsplɛndə/) is a global brand of sugar substitutes and reduced-calorie food products. While the company is known for its original formulation containing sucralose, it also manufactures items using natural sweeteners such as stevia, monk fruit and allulose. It is owned by the American company Heartland Food Products Group. The high-intensity sweetener ingredient sucralose used in Splenda Original is manufactured by the British company Tate & Lyle.

Sucralose was discovered by Tate & Lyle and researchers at Queen Elizabeth College, University of London, in 1976. While researching new insecticides, Shashikant Phadnis at Queen Elizabeth College misheard the instruction of his advisor Leslie Hough to "test" the chemical as "taste," due to his misunderstanding of the foreign accent, so he accidentally tasted the chemical and found it to be extremely sweet. Tate & Lyle subsequently developed sucralose-based Splenda products in partnership with Johnson & Johnson subsidiary McNeil Nutritionals, LLC. The Splenda brand was transferred to Heartland Food Products Group after its purchase of the line with investor Centerbridge Partners in 2015.

Since its approval by the United States government in 1998 and introduction there in 1999, sucralose has overtaken Equal in the $1.5-billion artificial sweetener market, holding a 62% market share. Splenda sales were $212 million in 2006 in the U.S., while Equal's totaled $48.7 million. According to a 2012 article in The New Zealand Herald, it is "the category leader in table-top sweetener in the U.S." Splenda is the most commonly used sugar substitute, with tens of millions of U.S. consumers per year (as of 2025).

== Products ==
Splenda is available in a variety of products:

- Splenda Original Sweeteners (based on sucralose)
- Splenda Stevia Sweeteners
- Splenda Monk Fruit Sweeteners
- Splenda Allulose Sweeteners
- Splenda Liquid Sweeteners
- Splenda Coffee Creamers
- Splenda Diabetes Care Shakes
- Splenda Premium Sweet Teas

== Energy (caloric) content ==
The energy content of a single-serving (1 g packet) of Splenda is 3.36 kcal, which is 31% of a single-serving (2.8 g packet) of granulated sugar (10.8 kcal). In the United States, it is legally labelled "zero calories"; U.S. FDA regulations allow this "if the food contains fewer than 5 Calories per reference amount customarily consumed and per labeled serving". Splenda powder consists of predominantly fillers as bulking agents – dextrose and maltodextrin. Sucralose content is about 1.1% and remainder is bulking agents.

== Cooking ==
Unlike other artificial sweeteners, sucralose is heat-stable up to 450 °F (232 °C), so Splenda can be used as a replacement for table sugar in cooking and baking, and there are Splenda products packaged specifically for this purpose. In product testing by Cook's Illustrated, the major drawback to cooking with Splenda was found to be that it does not produce the browning or caramelization the way table sugar does. However, Cook's Illustrated also found that desserts baked with Splenda were "lacking the artificial flavors that just about every other sugar substitute brings with it."

== Health and safety regulation ==
Splenda usually contains 95% dextrose (D-glucose) and maltodextrin (by volume) which the body readily metabolizes, combined with a small amount of mostly indigestible sucralose. Sucralose is made by replacing three select hydrogen-oxygen groups on sucrose (table sugar) molecules with three chlorine atoms. The tightly bound chlorine atoms create a molecular structure that is stable under intense conditions. Sucralose itself is recognized as safe to ingest as a diabetic sugar substitute, but the sugars or other carbohydrates used as bulking agents in Splenda products should be evaluated individually.

The acceptable daily intake (ADI) for sucralose is 5 mg per kilogram of body weight per day according to the U.S. Food and Drug Administration (FDA), and 15 mg/kg/day according to the European Food Safety Authority (EFSA). These values represent the amount that can be consumed daily over a lifetime without appreciable health risk.

A repeated dose study of sucralose in human subjects concluded that "there is no indication that adverse effects on human health would occur from frequent or long-term exposure to sucralose at the maximum anticipated levels of intake". Conversely, a Duke University animal study funded by the Sugar Association found evidence that doses of Splenda between 100 and 1000 mg/kg BW/day, containing sucralose at 1.1 to 11 mg/kg BW/day, fed to rats reduced fecal microflora, increased the pH level in the intestines, contributed to increases in body weight, and increased levels of P-glycoprotein (P-gp). These effects have not been reported in humans. In response, McNeil Nutritionals, along with an expert panel that included scientists from Duke University, Rutgers University, New York Medical College, Harvard School of Public Health, and Columbia University reported in Regulatory Toxicology and Pharmacology that the Duke study was "not scientifically rigorous and is deficient in several critical areas that preclude reliable interpretation of the study results". The other ingredients in Splenda—dextrose and maltodextrin—are listed as generally recognized as safe because of their long history of safe consumption.

Sucralose may not be completely biologically inert, and a study showed that cooking with sucralose at high temperatures could cause it to degrade into potentially toxic compounds. However, only a very small amount (approximately 2–8% of sucralose consumed) is metabolized by the body, on average.

== Marketing controversy ==
A Sugar Association complaint to the Federal Trade Commission stated that "Splenda is not a natural product. It is not cultivated or grown and it does not occur in nature." McNeil Nutritionals, the manufacturer of Splenda, has responded that its "advertising represents the products in an accurate and informative manner and complies with applicable advertising rules in the countries where Splenda brand products are marketed."

In 2006, Merisant, the maker of Equal, filed suit against McNeil Nutritionals in U.S. District Court, Philadelphia, alleging that Splenda's tagline; "made from sugar, so it tastes like sugar" is misleading. McNeil argued during the trial that it had never deceived consumers or set out to deceive them, since the product is in fact made from sugar. Merisant asked that McNeil be ordered to surrender profits and modify its advertising. The case ended with an agreement reached outside of court, with undisclosed settlement conditions. In 2004, Merisant filed a complaint with the Better Business Bureau regarding McNeil's advertising. McNeil alleged that Merisant's complaint was in retaliation for a ruling in federal court in Puerto Rico, which forced Merisant to stop packaging Equal in packages resembling Splenda's. McNeil filed suit in Puerto Rico seeking a ruling which would declare its advertising to not be misleading. Following Merisant's lawsuit in Philadelphia, McNeil agreed to a jury trial and to the dismissal of its lawsuit in Puerto Rico. However, on May 11, 2007, the parties reached a settlement on the case, the terms of which were not disclosed.

In 2007, Merisant France prevailed in the Commercial Court of Paris against subsidiaries of McNeil Nutritionals LLC. The court awarded Merisant $54,000 in damages and ordered the defendants to cease advertising claims found to violate French consumer protection laws, including the slogans; "because it comes from sugar, sucralose tastes like sugar" and "With sucralose: comes from sugar and tastes like sugar".

A 2008 Duke University study on rats, funded by the Sugar Association, found adverse effects of consuming Splenda. McNeil's parent Johnson & Johnson responded by sponsoring its own team of experts to refute the study.
