= Equal (sweetener) =

Brand of food sweetener

The Equal brand logo.

Equal is an American brand of artificial sweetener containing aspartame, acesulfame potassium, dextrose and maltodextrin. It is marketed as a tabletop sweetener by Heartland Food Corporation. Previously, it was owned by Whole Earth Brands. In French Canada, Equal is known as "Égal".

== History ==
In the early 1980s, Equal and its European counterpart, Canderel, were the first aspartame-based sweeteners to be sold to the public. Originally, the product was to be named Equa. The Chicago advertising agency for G. D. Searle, Tatham, Laird & Kudner, recommended adding an "L" to the end of the name, to imply its taste is equal to sugar.

== Products ==
Equal is sold variously as a bottled powder ("Equal Spoonful"), in blue individual-serving packets, and as a dissolving tablet for use in beverages such as tea and coffee.

=== Contents ===
An Equal packet contains dextrose, aspartame (1.7%), acesulfame potassium (1.2%), starch, silicon dioxide (an anti-caking agent), maltodextrin, and unspecified flavouring.

Equal tablets are not an identical formulation, and their primary ingredient is lactose.

Aspartame-based products have gained regulatory approvals permitting sale in more than 100 countries. Merisant's NutraSweet company states that aspartame is now used in more than 5,000 products and consumed by some 250 million people worldwide. Companies using aspartame include The Coca-Cola Company and PepsiCo.

In 2006–2007, Merisant and McNeil Nutritionals were involved in a protracted legal battle over marketing for Splenda. (Main article: Sucralose.) On January 9, 2009, Merisant filed for Chapter 11 bankruptcy protection.

== Aspartame-containing products made by NutraSweet / Merisant ==
- Canderel – sold in most of Asia, Europe, the Middle East and Africa, and Mexico. It is the leading aspartame-based sweetener in France (where it was launched in 1979) and the United Kingdom (since 1983).
- Equal – first sold in the United States in 1982; also sold in New Zealand, Malaysia, Thailand, Australia, South Africa, India and Hong Kong.
- EqualSweet – sold in Argentina.
- NutraSweet – used as an ingredient in many processed foods, drinks and tablets;

In 1997, it also began to be marketed as a table sweetener in the United States. NutraSweet is now owned by an investment company out of Boston by the name J.W. Childs and has no affiliation to Merisant.

== See also ==
- Aspartame controversy
- Sugar substitute
