= Sucralose =

Non-nutritive sweetener

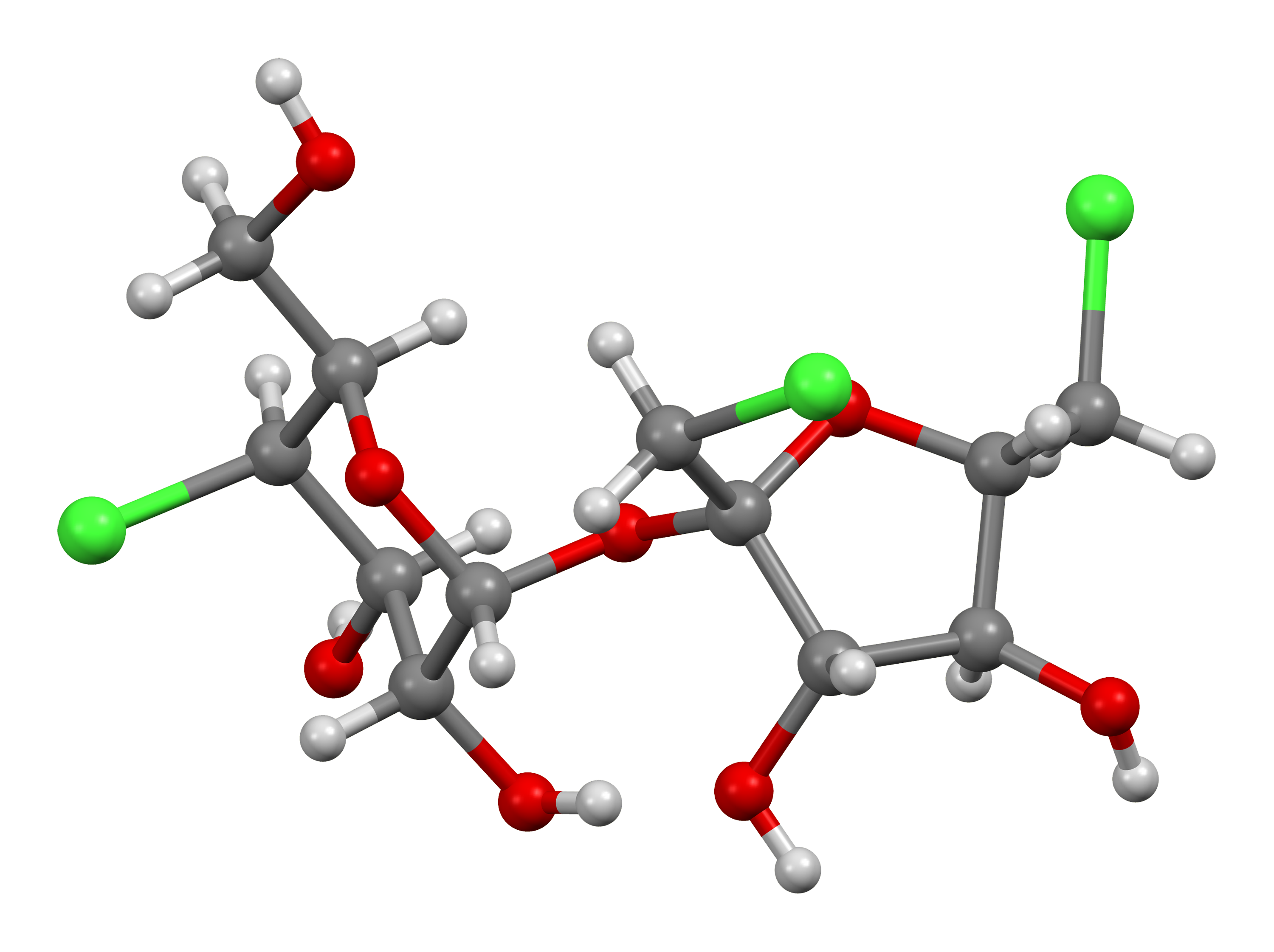

Names
- IUPAC name 1,6-Dichloro-1,6-dideoxy-β-D-fructofuranosyl 4-chloro-4-deoxy-α-D-galactopyranoside
- Systematic IUPAC name (2R,3R,4R,5R,6R)-2-{[(2R,3S,4S,5S)-2,5-Bis(chloromethyl)-3,4-dihydroxyoxolan-2-yl]oxy}-5-chloro-6-(hydroxymethyl)oxane-3,4-diol
- Other names: 1′,4,6′-Trichlorogalactosucrose; Trichlorosucrose; E955; 4,1′,6′-Trichloro-4,1′,6′-trideoxygalactosucrose; TGS

Identifiers
CAS Number	56038-13-2
3D model (JSmol)	Interactive image
ChEBI	CHEBI:32159
ChemSpider	64561
ECHA InfoCard	100.054.484
EC Number	259-952-2
E number	E955 (glazing agents, ...)
KEGG	C12285
PubChem CID	71485
UNII	96K6UQ3ZD4
CompTox Dashboard (EPA)	DTXSID1040245
- InChI: InChI=1S/C12H19Cl3O8/c13-1-4-7(17)10(20)12(3-14,22-4)23-11-9(19)8(18)6(15)5(2-16)21-11/h4-11,16-20H,1-3H2/t4-,5-,6+,7-,8+,9-,10+,11-,12+/m1/s1 Key: BAQAVOSOZGMPRM-QBMZZYIRSA-N; InChI=1/C12H19Cl3O8/c13-1-4-7(17)10(20)12(3-14,22-4)23-11-9(19)8(18)6(15)5(2-16)21-11/h4-11,16-20H,1-3H2/t4-,5-,6+,7-,8+,9-,10+,11-,12+/m1/s1 Key: BAQAVOSOZGMPRM-QBMZZYIRBF
- SMILES: Cl[C@H]2[C@H](O[C@H](O[C@@]1(O[C@@H]([C@@H](O)[C@@H]1O)CCl)CCl)[C@H](O)[C@H]2O)CO

Properties
Chemical formula	C_{12}H_{19}Cl_{3}O_{8}
Molar mass	397.63 g·mol^{−1}
Appearance	Off-white to white powder
Odor	Odorless
Density	1.69 g/cm^{3}
Melting point	125 °C (257 °F; 398 K)
Solubility in water	283 g/L (20 °C)
Acidity (pK_{a})	12.52±0.70

Hazards
NFPA 704 (fire diamond)	1 1 0
- Except where otherwise noted, data are given for materials in their standard state (at 25 °C [77 °F], 100 kPa). verify (what is ?) Infobox references

Sucralose (C_{12}H_{19}Cl_{3}O_{8}) with standard atomic coloring (black=carbon, white=hydrogen, green=chlorine, red=oxygen)

Sucralose is an artificial sweetener and sugar substitute. In the European Union, it is also known under the E number E955. It is produced by chlorination of sucrose, selectively replacing three of the hydroxy groups. Sucralose is about 600 times sweeter than sucrose (table sugar), three times as sweet as both aspartame and acesulfame potassium, and twice as sweet as sodium saccharin.

The commercial success of sucralose-based products stems from its favorable comparison to other low-calorie sweeteners in terms of taste, stability, and safety.

== Uses ==
Sucralose is used in many food and beverage products because it is a non-nutritive sweetener (14 kilojoules [3.3 kcal] per typical one-gram serving), does not promote dental cavities, is safe for consumption by diabetics and nondiabetics and does not affect insulin levels. The powdered form of the sucralose-based sweetener product Splenda contains two bulking agents: dextrose and maltodextrin. Sucralose content is about 1.1% and the remainder is bulking agents.

Sucralose is used as a replacement for (or in combination with) other artificial or natural sweeteners such as aspartame, acesulfame potassium or high-fructose corn syrup. It is used in products such as candy, breakfast bars, coffee pods, and soft drinks. It is also used in canned fruits wherein water and sucralose take the place of much higher-energy corn syrup-based additives. Sucralose mixed with dextrose (glucose) or maltodextrin (both made from corn) as bulking agents is sold internationally by McNeil Nutritionals under the Splenda brand name.

=== Cooking ===
This mixture of granulated sucralose includes fillers, all of which rapidly dissolve in water. Sucralose is not hygroscopic when humidity is below 80%, which can lead to baked goods that are noticeably drier and manifest a less dense texture than those made with sucrose.

== Safety evaluation ==
Sucralose has been accepted as safe by several food safety regulatory bodies worldwide, including the U.S. Food and Drug Administration (FDA), the Joint FAO/WHO Expert Committee Report on Food Additives, the European Union's Scientific Committee on Food, Health Canada, and Food Standards Australia New Zealand.

At normal baking temperatures, sucralose is mostly heat-stable, indicating that it retains its sweetness and is suitable as a sugar substitute for use in baked goods. However, there is concern about the possible formation of dioxins when sucralose is heated. Especially when heating sucralose above 120 °C, chlorinated organic compounds such as polychlorinated dibenzo-p-dioxins (PCDD), polychlorinated dibenzofurans (PCDF), or chloropropanol form in unknown amounts.

=== Maximum acceptable daily intake ===
Various assessments have reported different amounts of maximum acceptable daily intake (ADI), usually measured as mg per kg of body weight. According to the Canadian Diabetes Association, the amount of sucralose that can be consumed over a person's lifetime without adverse effect on health status is 9 milligrams per kilogram of body weight per day. The FDA approval process indicated that consuming sucralose in typical amounts as a sweetener was safe. The intake at which adverse effects are seen is 1500 mg per kilogram of body weight per day, providing a large margin of safety compared to the estimated daily intake. Both the European Food Safety Authority (EFSA) and FDA established it as 15 mg per kilogram of body weight, that is, 350–1050 mg per day for a person of 70 kg.

=== Metabolism ===
Most ingested sucralose is directly excreted in the feces, while about 11–27% is absorbed by the gastrointestinal tract (gut). The amount absorbed from the gut is largely removed from the blood by the kidneys and eliminated via urine, with 20–30% of absorbed sucralose being metabolized.

=== Possible health effects ===
As of 2026, reviews of numerous safety and toxicology studies on sucralose concluded that it is not toxic or carcinogenic, even at levels of daily consumption much larger than those typically used. In reviewing a 1987 food additive petition by McNeil Nutritionals, the FDA stated that "in the 2-year rodent bioassays [...] there was no evidence of carcinogenic activity for either sucralose or its hydrolysis products".

No evidence of an effect of sucralose on long-term weight loss or body mass index has been found. In 2023, the World Health Organization (WHO) conditionally, citing "limited evidence", recommended against the use of non-sugar sweeteners, including sucralose, for weight management or preventive care in the general population (except for diabetics). Instead, it recommended reducing the intake of sugar, highly processed food and sweetened beverages, and replacing them with minimally processed unsweetened beverages and foods, such as fruits.

== History ==
Sucralose was discovered in 1975 by scientists from Tate & Lyle, working with researchers Leslie Hough and Shashikant Phadnis at Queen Elizabeth College (now part of King's College London). While researching novel uses of sucrose and its synthetic derivatives, mixing sulfuryl chloride with sugar, Phadnis was told to "test" a chlorinated sugar compound. According to an anecdotal account, Phadnis thought Hough asked him to "taste" it, so he did and found the compound to be exceptionally sweet. Tate & Lyle patented the substance in 1976; as of 2008, the only remaining patents concerned specific manufacturing processes.

Sucralose was first approved for use in Canada in 1991. Subsequent approvals came in Australia in 1993, in New Zealand in 1996, in the United States in 1998, and in the European Union in 2004. By 2008, it had been approved in over 80 countries, including Mexico, Brazil, China, India, and Japan. In 2006, the FDA amended the regulations for foods to include sucralose as a "non-nutritive sweetener" in food. In May 2008, Fusion Nutraceuticals launched a generic product to the market, using Tate & Lyle patents.

In April 2015, PepsiCo announced that it would be moving from aspartame to sucralose for most of its diet drinks in the U.S. due to sales of Diet Pepsi falling by more than 5% in the U.S. The company stated that its decision was a commercial one, responding to consumer preferences. In February 2018, PepsiCo went back to using aspartame in Diet Pepsi because of an 8% drop in sales for the previous year.

== Chemistry and production ==
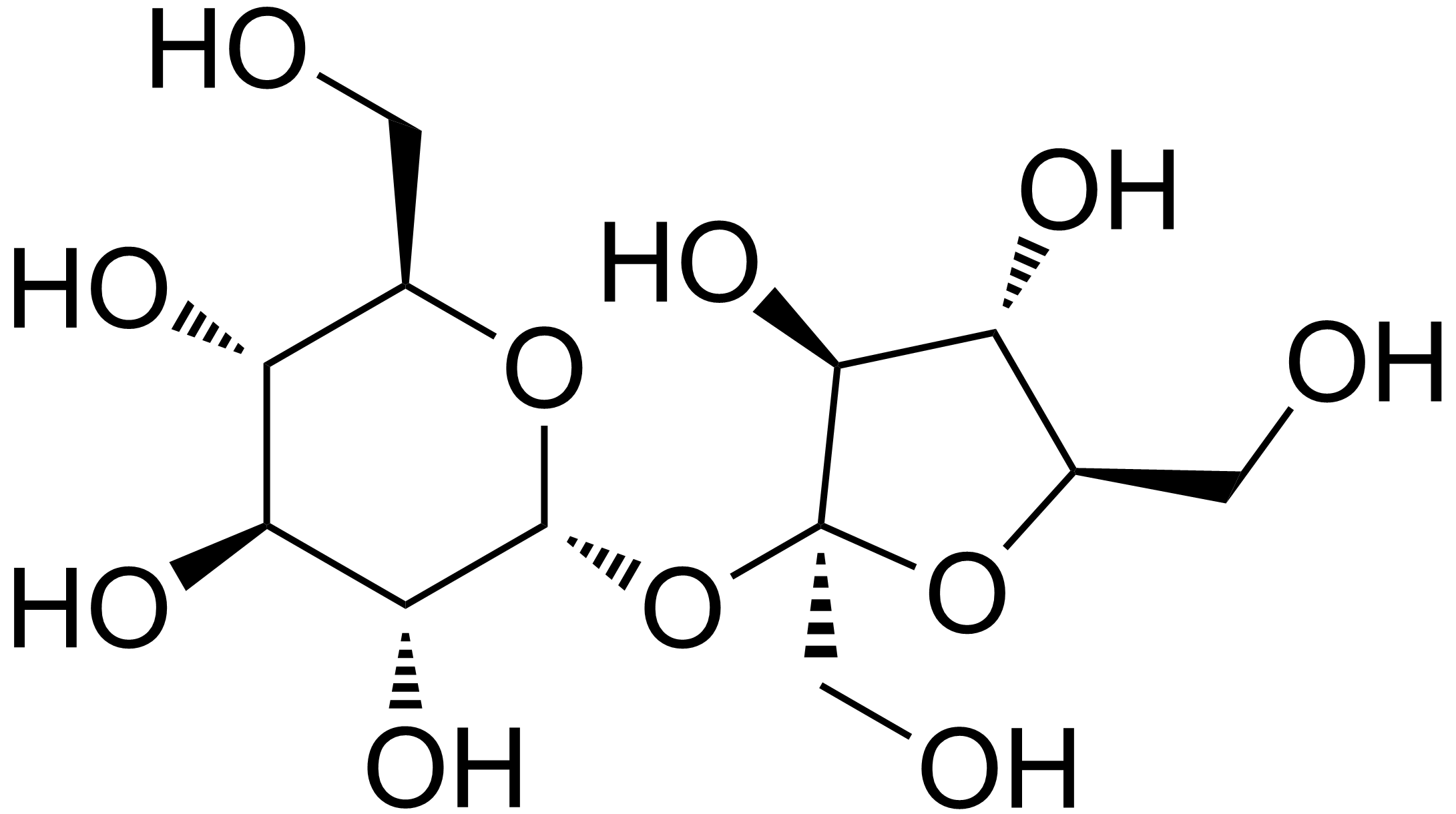

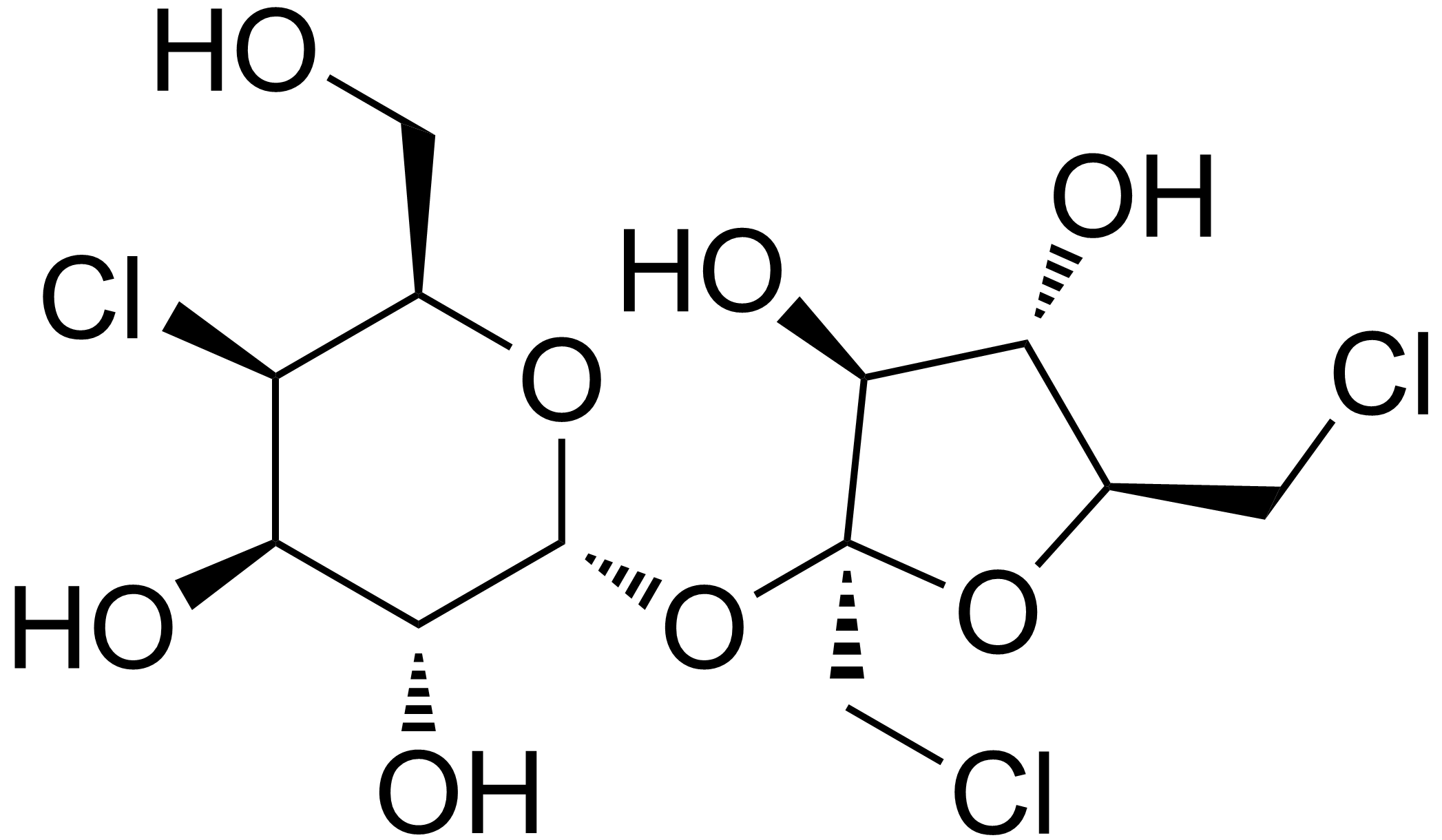
Comparison of the chemical structures of sucrose (top) and sucralose (bottom)

Sucralose is a disaccharide composed of 1,6-dichloro-1,6-dideoxyfructose and 4-chloro-4-deoxygalactose. It is synthesized by the selective chlorination of sucrose in a multistep route that substitutes three specific hydroxyl groups with chlorine atoms. This chlorination is achieved by selective protection of one of the primary alcohols as an ester (acetate or benzoate), followed by chlorination with an excess of any of several chlorinating agent to replace the two remaining primary alcohols and one of the secondary alcohols, and then by hydrolysis of the ester.

=== Storage ===
Sucralose is stable when stored under normal conditions of temperature, pressure and humidity. Upon prolonged heating during storage at elevated temperatures (38 °C, 100 °F), sucralose may break down, releasing carbon dioxide, carbon monoxide and minor amounts of hydrogen chloride.

== Environmental effects ==
Sucralose has been detected in natural waters, but research indicates that the levels found in the environment are far below those required to cause adverse effects to certain kinds of aquatic life. The majority of ingested sucralose is not metabolized by the human body, but is instead excreted unchanged. It is an emerging environmental contaminant that cannot be removed in conventional waste water treatment process.

== See also ==
- Sugar substitute
