= List of health scares =

A health scare is a widely reported story about the danger of something, usually a consumer good or medical product. Such scares have been promoted for decades but have become more popular with the advent of the Internet. They may be based on a misinterpretation of scientific studies, or, as has happened more recently, complete fabrication. This page lists widely reported media stories about how some good or product may have a certain adverse health effect, regardless of whether subsequent research confirmed the proposed link, debunked it, or has been inconclusive.

== MMR vaccine controversy ==
In 1998, a paper, of which Andrew Wakefield was the lead author, was published in The Lancet suggesting that the MMR vaccine might cause autism. Since then, many epidemiological studies have refuted this hypothesis, and Wakefield has been found guilty of scientific fraud. The vaccine-autism link, since it has led to declining vaccination rates and, in turn, epidemics of and deaths from vaccine-preventable diseases, has been called the "most damaging medical hoax of the last 100 years."

== Aspartame controversy ==
In 1998 an email began circulating claiming that aspartame, an artificial sweetener, caused many chronic diseases, including multiple sclerosis and lupus. The email was attributed to "Nancy Markle" and cited sources such as the Multiple Sclerosis Foundation and the World Environmental Conference. However, although it appears credible, the claims made in the email are a complete fabrication, and statements about the toxicity of methanol produced by aspartame metabolism rely on ignoring the small amounts produced by this process.

== Cancer-causing shampoo ==
Some types of shampoo contain sodium lauryl sulfate (SLS) as a foaming agent. Also in the late 1990s, many websites claimed that this ingredient could, at the doses found in shampoo, cause cancer. However, according to the American Cancer Society, SLS is an irritant, not a carcinogen, and according to David Emery of About.com, this claim is promoted primarily by makers of all-natural personal care products.

== Dangers of power lines ==
The hypothesis of a link between proximity to power lines and leukemia was first raised in 1979 when a study was published in the American Journal of Epidemiology. The study contended that children living in homes in close proximity to "an excess of electrical wiring configurations" were more likely to develop cancer. The ensuing public controversy has been described by John W. Farley as a health scare, and has said that there is "nothing to worry about" with regard to the proposed link between power lines and cancer. Although, in 1996, the United States National Research Council concluded that "the current body of evidence does not show that exposure to these fields presents a human-health hazard," some studies have reported an association between the two, e.g., for myeloid leukemia and Hodgkin's lymphoma.

== Cell phones and cancer ==
The hypothesized link between cell phone use and an increased risk of cancer is based on the fact that these phones emit radio waves, a form of non-ionizing radiation. Since the proposal was first made many studies have been published on the topic. According to the World Health Organization, the results have been "mixed" with regard specifically to glioma and acoustic neuroma; thus, the International Agency for Research on Cancer has classified cell phones as group 2B carcinogens, meaning they are "possibly carcinogenic." However, given the considerable amount of fear regarding the alleged link, some commentators have described the link as a health scare, regardless of whether or not mobile phone use actually does cause cancer.

== Nitrites and cancer ==
Nitrites are compounds found in processed meat, which have been implicated in causing cancer because they can be converted into nitrosamines in the body, and because of a 1970 study linking nitrosamines to cancer in rats. Additional support to this hypothesis came from a 1979 study in Science that has since been discredited. Critics of the hypothesized nitrites-cancer link argue that the amount of nitrite produced by the human body is far greater than the amount consumed through processed meat. Others, such as the World Cancer Research Fund, disagree, saying that people should limit their consumption of processed meat because "Dietary nitrates and nitrites are probable human carcinogens because they are converted in the body to N-nitroso compounds."
