= Glucan 1,4-α-maltotetraohydrolase =

Identifiers
- EC no.: 3.2.1.60
- CAS no.: 37288-44-1

Databases
- IntEnz: IntEnz view
- BRENDA: BRENDA entry
- ExPASy: NiceZyme view
- KEGG: KEGG entry
- MetaCyc: metabolic pathway
- PRIAM: profile
- PDB structures: RCSB PDB PDBe PDBsum
Search
- PMC: articles
- PubMed: articles
- NCBI: proteins

Glucan 1,4-α-maltotetraohydrolase (EC 3.2.1.60, exo-maltotetraohydrolase, 1,4-α-D-glucan maltotetraohydrolase) is an enzyme with systematic name 4-α-D-glucan maltotetraohydrolase. It catalyses the hydrolysis of (1→4)-α-D-glucosidic linkages in amylaceous polysaccharides, to remove successive maltotetraose residues from the non-reducing chain ends
