= Micro-encapsulation =

Process which surrounds tiny particles or droplets with a coating

Microencapsulation is a process in which tiny particles or droplets are surrounded by a coating to give small capsules, with useful properties. In general, it is used to incorporate food ingredients, enzymes, cells or other materials on a micrometric scale. Microencapsulation can also be used to enclose solids, liquids, or gases inside a micrometric wall made of hard or soft soluble film, in order to reduce dosing frequency and prevent the degradation of pharmaceuticals.

In its simplest form, a microcapsule is a small sphere comprising a near-uniform wall enclosing some material. The enclosed material in the microcapsule is referred to as the core, internal phase, or fill, whereas the wall is sometimes called a shell, coating, or membrane. Some materials like lipids and polymers, such as alginate, may be used as a mixture to trap the material of interest inside. Most microcapsules have pores with diameters between a few nanometers and a few micrometers. Materials generally used for coating are:

- Ethyl cellulose
- Polyvinyl alcohol
- Gelatin
- Sodium alginate
- Formaldehyde resin
- Urea-formaldehyde
- Polyurea
- Maltodextrin (for oil in food)
IUPAC definition

Microcapsule: Hollow microparticle composed of a solid shell surrounding a core-forming space available to permanently or temporarily entrapped substances.

Note: The substances can be flavour compounds, pharmaceuticals, pesticides, dyes, or similar materials.

The definition has been expanded, and includes most foods, where the encapsulation of flavors is the most common. The technique of microencapsulation depends on the physical and chemical properties of the material to be encapsulated.

Many microcapsules however bear little resemblance to these simple spheres. The core may be a crystal, a jagged adsorbent particle, an emulsion, a Pickering emulsion, a suspension of solids, or a suspension of smaller microcapsules. The microcapsule even may have multiple walls.

== Techniques of microcapsule manufacture ==
Ionotropic gelation occurs when units of uric acid in the chains of the polymer alginate, crosslink with multivalent cations. These may include, calcium, zinc, iron and aluminium.

Coacervation-phase separation consists of three steps carried out under continuous agitation.

1. Formation of three immiscible chemical phases: liquid manufacturing vehicle phase, core material phase and coating material phase.
2. Deposition of coating: core material is dispersed in the coating polymer solution. Coating polymer material coated around core. Deposition of liquid polymer coating around core by polymer adsorbed at the interface formed between core material and vehicle phase.
3. Rigidization of coating: coating material is immiscible in vehicle phase and is made rigid. This is done by thermal, cross-linking, or dissolution techniques.

=== Interfacial polycondensation ===
In interfacial polycondensation, the two reactants in a polycondensation meet at an interface and react rapidly. The basis of this method is the classical Schotten-Baumann reaction between an acid chloride and a compound containing an active hydrogen atom, such as an amine or alcohol, polyesters, polyurea, polyurethane. Under the right conditions, thin flexible walls form rapidly at the interface. A solution of the compound to be encapsulated and a diacid chloride are emulsified in water and an aqueous solution containing an amine and a polyfunctional isocyanate is added. Base is present to neutralize the acid formed during the reaction. Condensed polymer walls form instantaneously at the interface of the emulsion droplets.

=== Interfacial cross-linking ===
Interfacial cross-linking is derived from interfacial polycondensation, and was developed to avoid the use of toxic diamines, for pharmaceutical or cosmetic applications. In this method, the small bifunctional monomer containing active hydrogen atoms is replaced by a biosourced polymer, like a protein. When the reaction is performed at the interface of an emulsion, the acid chloride reacts with the various functional groups of the protein, leading to the formation of a membrane. The method is very versatile, and the properties of the microcapsules (size, porosity, degradability, mechanical resistance) can be customized. Flow of artificial microcapsules in microfluidic channels:

=== In situ polymerization ===
In a few microencapsulation processes, the direct polymerization of a single monomer is carried out on the particle surface. In one process, e.g. cellulose fibers are encapsulated in polyethylene while immersed in dry toluene. Usual deposition rates are about 0.5μm/min. Coating thickness ranges 0.2–75 μm (0.0079–2.9528 mils). The coating is uniform, even over sharp projections. Protein microcapsules are biocompatible and biodegradable, and the presence of the protein backbone renders the membrane more resistant and elastic than those obtained by interfacial polycondensation.

=== Matrix polymerization ===
In a number of processes, a core material is imbedded in a polymeric matrix during formation of the particles. A simple method of this type is spray-drying, in which the particle is formed by evaporation of the solvent from the matrix material. However, the solidification of the matrix also can be caused by a chemical change.

== Release methods and patterns ==
Even when the aim of a microencapsulation application is the isolation of the core from its surrounding, the wall must be ruptured at the time of use. Many walls are ruptured easily by pressure or shear stress, as in the case of breaking dye particles during writing to form a copy. Capsule contents may be released by melting the wall, or dissolving it under particular conditions, as in the case of an enteric drug coating. In other systems, the wall is broken by solvent action, enzyme attack, chemical reaction, hydrolysis, or slow disintegration.

Microencapsulation can be used to slow the release of a drug into the body. This may permit one controlled release dose to substitute for several doses of non-encapsulated drug and also may decrease toxic side effects for some drugs by preventing high initial concentrations in the blood. There is usually a certain desired release pattern. In some cases, it is zero-order, i.e. the release rate is constant. In this case, the microcapsules deliver a fixed amount of drug per minute or hour during the period of their effectiveness. This can occur as long as a solid reservoir or dissolving drug is maintained in the microcapsule.

A more typical release pattern is first-order in which the rate decreases exponentially with time until the drug source is exhausted. In this situation, a fixed amount of drug is in solution inside the microcapsule. The concentration difference between the inside and the outside of the capsule decreases continually as the drug diffuses.

Nevertheless, there are some other mechanisms that may take place in the liberation of the encapsulated material. These include, biodegradation, osmotic pressure, diffusion, etc. Each one will depend on the composition of the capsule made and the environment it is in. Therefore, the liberation of the material may be affected by various mechanisms that act simultaneously.

== Applications ==
Applications of micro-encapsulation are numerous.

- It is mainly used to increase the stability and life of the product being encapsulated, facilitate the manipulation of the product and provide for the controlled release of the contents.
  - Microencapsulation is used to preserve vitamin A from the deteriorating effects of oxygen.
  - Microencapsulated formulations of tretinoin/benzoyl peroxide utilize a silica-based sol-gel technology to combine these ingredients without damaging the tretinoin.
  - Microencapsulation of edible oil and other hard-to-powder items turn it into a more convenient powder form while protecting it from oxidation. This is most commonly used for instant food. A water-soluble wall material like maltodextrin or gum arabic is used, so that the microcapsule dissolves away when water is added. Alcohol powder is another example.
- In other cases, the objective is not to isolate the core completely but to control the rate at which it releases the contents, as in the controlled-release of drugs:
  - Ferrous sulfate, a nutritional supplement, is microencapsulated in a way that it passes through the stomach but releases in the intestine. In this way, gastric upset is minimized.
  - Aspirin is treated similarly.
- Some sunscreens are encapsulated in silica gel. One brand is "Eusolex UV-Pearls". These chemicals are potentially hormone disrupting, so the encapsulation protects the user until the time of application.
- pesticides are dangerous to handle but less so when encapsulated. Microencapsulation minimizes leaching or volatilization risks.

The problem may be as simple as masking the taste or odor of the core, or as complex as increasing the selectivity of an adsorption or extraction process.

- DNA protection from degradation for product tracing and data storage
- Protection of bioactive compounds that are easily degradated under normal environmental conditions.

== See also ==
- Dry water
- Alcohol powder

== Bibliography ==
- Prakash, S. et al. "The Gut Microbiota and Human Health with an Emphasis on the Use of Microencapsulated Bacterial Cells", Journal of Biomedicine and Biotechnology (2011),
- Brandau, T (2002). "Preparation of monodisperse controlled release microcapsules". Int. J. Pharm. 242 (1–2): 179–184. doi:10.1016/S0378-5173(02)00151-5. PMID 12176243.
