= Aspartame controversy =

Medical controversy

The artificial sweetener aspartame has been the subject of several controversies since its initial approval by the U.S. Food and Drug Administration (FDA) in 1974. The FDA approval of aspartame was highly contested, beginning with suspicions of its involvement in brain cancer, alleging that the quality of the initial research supporting its safety was inadequate and flawed, and that conflicts of interest marred the 1981 approval of aspartame, previously evaluated by two FDA panels that concluded to keep the approval on hold before further investigation. In 1987, the U.S. Government Accountability Office concluded that the food additive approval process had been followed properly for aspartame. The irregularities fuelled a conspiracy theory, which the "Nancy Markle" email hoax circulated, along with claims—counter to the weight of medical evidence—that numerous health conditions (such as multiple sclerosis, systemic lupus, methanol toxicity, blindness, spasms, shooting pains, seizures, headaches, depression, anxiety, memory loss, birth defects, and death) are caused by the consumption of aspartame in normal doses.

Aspartame is a methyl ester of the aspartic acid/phenylalanine dipeptide. Potential health risks have been examined and dismissed by numerous scientific research projects. With the exception of the risk to those with phenylketonuria, aspartame is considered to be a safe food additive by governments worldwide and major health and food safety organizations. FDA officials describe aspartame as "one of the most thoroughly tested and studied food additives the agency has ever approved" and its safety as "clear cut." The weight of existing scientific evidence indicates that aspartame is safe as a non-nutritive sweetener.

== Origins ==
The controversy over aspartame safety originated in perceived irregularities in the aspartame approval process during the 1970s and early 1980s, including allegations of a revolving door relationship between regulators and industry and claims that aspartame producer G.D. Searle had withheld and falsified safety data. In 1996, the controversy reached a wider audience with a 60 Minutes report that discussed criticisms of the FDA approval process and concerns that aspartame could cause brain tumors in humans. The 60 Minutes special stated that "aspartame's approval was one of the most contested in FDA history."

Around the same time, a Usenet post was widely circulated under the pen name "Nancy Markle", creating the basis for a misleading and unverifiable hoax chain letter that was spread through the Internet. Numerous websites have spread the email's claims, which were not supported by scientific evidence, about safety issues purportedly linked to aspartame, including Gulf War syndrome and lupus.

== U.S. FDA approval ==
Aspartame was originally approved for use in dry foods in 1974 by then FDA Commissioner Alexander Schmidt after review by the FDA's Center for Food Safety and Applied Nutrition. Searle had submitted 168 studies on aspartame, including seven animal studies that were considered crucial by the FDA. Soon afterwards, John Olney, a professor of psychiatry and prominent critic of MSG, along with James Turner, a public-interest lawyer and author of an anti-food-additive book, filed a petition for a public hearing, citing safety concerns. Other criticisms presented in the 1996 60 Minutes special of the Searle studies included assertions of unreported medical treatments that may have affected the study outcomes and discrepancies in the reported data. Schmidt agreed, pending an investigation into alleged improprieties in safety studies for aspartame and several drugs. In December 1975, the FDA placed a stay on the aspartame approval, preventing Searle from marketing aspartame. The Searle studies were criticized by the FDA commissioner as "... at best ... sloppy and suffering from ... a pattern of conduct which compromises the scientific integrity of the studies."

U.S. Attorney Samuel Skinner was requested to "open a grand jury investigation into whether two of Searle's aspartame studies had been falsified or were incomplete." Skinner withdrew from the case when he was considering a job offer from the law firm Sidley & Austin, Searle's Chicago-based law firm, a job he later took. The investigation was delayed and eventually the statute of limitations on the charges against Searle expired and a grand jury was never convened.

In 1977 and 1978, an FDA task force and a panel of academic pathologists reviewed 15 aspartame studies by Searle, and concluded that, although there were major lapses in quality control, the resulting inconsistencies would not have affected the studies' conclusions. In 1980, a Public Board of Inquiry (PBOI) heard testimony from Olney and disagreed with his claims that aspartame could cause brain damage, including in the developing fetus. The board decided that further study was needed on a postulated connection between aspartame and brain tumors, and revoked approval of aspartame.

In 1981, FDA Commissioner Arthur Hull Hayes sought advice on the issue from a panel of FDA scientists and a lawyer. The panel identified errors underlying the PBOI conclusion that aspartame might cause brain tumors, and presented arguments both for and against approval. Hayes approved the use of aspartame in dry foods. Hayes further justified his approval by citing the results of a Japanese brain tumor study, the results of which, the PBOI chairman later said, would have resulted in an "unqualified approval" from the PBOI panel. Several objections followed, but all were denied. In November 1983, about a year after approving aspartame, Hayes left the FDA and joined the public-relations firm Burson-Marsteller, Searle's public relations agency at the time, as a senior medical adviser.

The actions of Samuel Skinner, in taking a job with a law firm retained by Searle during an investigation into Searle, and Arthur Hull Hayes, in taking a job with Searle's public relations agency following aspartame's approval, fueled conspiracy theories.

Because of the approval controversy, Senator Howard M. Metzenbaum requested an investigation by the U.S. Government Accountability Office (GAO) of aspartame's approval. In 1987, the GAO reported that protocol had been followed and provided a time-line of events in the approval process. The GAO review included a survey of scientists who had conducted safety reviews; of the 67 scientists who responded to a questionnaire, 12 had major concerns about aspartame's safety, 26 were somewhat concerned but generally confident in aspartame safety, and 29 were very confident in aspartame safety.

Food additive safety evaluations by many countries have led to approval of aspartame, citing the general lack of adverse effects following consumption in reasonable quantities. Based on government research reviews and recommendations from advisory bodies such as those listed above, aspartame has been found to be safe for human consumption by more than ninety countries worldwide.

== Alleged conflict of interest prior to 1996 ==
In 1976, the FDA notified then-U.S. attorney for Chicago, Sam Skinner, of the ongoing investigation of Searle, and in January 1977, formally requested that a grand jury be convened. In February, 1977, Searle's law firm, Sidley & Austin offered Skinner a job and Skinner recused himself from the case. Mr. Skinner's successor was in place several months later, and the statute of limitations for the alleged offenses expired in October 1977. Despite complaints and urging from DOJ in Washington, neither the interim U.S. attorney for Chicago, William Conlon, nor Skinner's successor, Thomas Sullivan, convened a grand jury. In December 1977, Sullivan ordered the case dropped for lack of evidence. A year and a half later, Conlon also was hired by Sidley & Austin. Concern about conflict of interest in this case inflamed the controversy, and Senator Metzenbaum investigated in 1981 Senate Hearings. In 1989, the U.S. Senate approved the nomination of Sam Skinner to be Secretary of Transportation, noting that both Sullivan and Senator Metzenbaum had concluded that Skinner had not acted improperly.

Ralph G. Walton, a psychiatrist at Northeastern Ohio Universities College of Medicine, stated in a self-published 1996 analysis of aspartame research that industry-funded studies found no safety concerns while 84 of 92 independent studies did identify safety concerns. This analysis by Walton was submitted to the television show 60 Minutes and has been extensively discussed on the Internet. An analysis of Walton's claims showed that Walton left out at least 50 peer-reviewed safety studies from his review of the literature and that most of the research he cites as non-industry funded were actually letters to the editors, case reports, review articles or book chapters rather than published studies. In a rebuttal to Walton's statements, the Aspartame Information Service (a service provided by Ajinomoto, a primary producer and supplier of aspartame), reviewed the publications Walton cites as critical of aspartame, arguing that most of them do not involve aspartame or do not draw negative conclusions, are not peer-reviewed, are anecdotal, or are duplicates.

== Internet hoax conspiracy theory ==
An elaborate health scare, involving a hoax conspiracy theory disseminated on many websites in 1999, attributes a host of deleterious medical effects to aspartame. This theory claims that the FDA approval process of aspartame was tainted and cites as its source an email based upon a supposed talk by a "Nancy Markle" (thought to be Betty Martini, who first circulated the email) at a "World Environmental Conference." Specifically, the hoax websites allege that aspartame is responsible for multiple sclerosis, systemic lupus, and methanol toxicity, causing "blindness, spasms, shooting pains, seizures, headaches, depression, anxiety, memory loss, birth defects" and death. A proliferation of websites, many with sensationalist URLs, are filled with anecdotal claims and medical misinformation. The Markle hoax and its extended argument on "aspartamekills.com" have not been supported by medical studies. The email has been described as an "Internet smear campaign ... Its contents were entirely false, misleading, and defamatory to various popular products and their manufacturers, with no basis whatever in fact."

The "Markle" email says that there is a conspiracy between the FDA and the producers of aspartame, and the conspiracy theory has become a canonical example discussed on several Internet conspiracy theory and urban legend websites. Although most of the allegations of this theory contradict the bulk of medical evidence, the misinformation has spread around the world as chain emails since mid-December 1998, influencing many websites as an urban legend that continues to scare consumers. The Media Awareness Network featured one version of it in a tutorial on how to determine the credibility of a web page. The tutorial implied that the "Markle" letter was not credible and stated that it should not be used as an authoritative source of information.

Dean Edell warned very strongly against the "Markle" letter:

Beware The E-Mail Hoax: The Evils Of Nutrasweet (Aspartame)

A highly inaccurate "chain letter" is being circulated via e-mail warning the reader of the health dangers of aspartame (Nutrasweet) diet drinks. There is so much scientific untruth in it, it's scary. Be careful, because others know how to manipulate you by this. Just because something is beyond your comprehension doesn't mean it is scientific. The e-mail is outrageous enough to state that the Multiple Sclerosis Foundation is suing the FDA for collusion with Monsanto ... Bogus, totally bogus. You've got to be careful of these Internet hoaxes. When you read health information online, be sure to know the source of the information you are reading, okay?

== Government action and voluntary withdrawals ==
In 1997, due to public concerns, the U.K. government introduced a new regulation obliging food makers who use sweeteners to state clearly next to the name of their product the phrase "with sweeteners."

In 2007, the Indonesian government considered banning aspartame. In the Philippines, the small political party Alliance for Rural Concerns introduced House Bill 4747 in 2008 with the aim of having aspartame banned from the food supply. In the U.S. state of New Mexico a bill to ban aspartame was introduced in 2007, and subsequently rejected. A similar 2008 Hawaii bill stalled in committee for lack of evidence. In March 2009, the California OEHHA identified aspartame as a chemical for consultation by its Carcinogen Identification Committee, in accordance with California state Proposition 65, and it was reviewed at the November 15, 2016 meeting.

In 2007, the U.K. supermarket chains Sainsbury's, Marks & Spencer, and Wal-Mart subsidiary Asda, announced that they would no longer use aspartame in their own label products. In April 2009, Ajinomoto Sweeteners Europe, one of the makers of aspartame in Europe, responded to Asda's "no nasties" campaign by filing a complaint of malicious falsehood against Asda in the English courts. In July 2009, Asda initially won the legal case after the trial judge construed the "no nasties" labelling to "not mean that aspartame was potentially harmful or unhealthy." The decision was reversed in June 2010, upon appeal, and was settled in 2011 with ASDA removing references to aspartame from its packaging.

In 2009, the South African retailer Woolworths announced it was removing aspartame-containing foods from its own-brand range.

In 2010, the British Food Standards Agency funded a clinical study of people who claimed to experience side-effects after consuming aspartame. The double blind controlled study has been concluded and found no evidence of safety issues or side effects even amongst those volunteers who had previously claimed sensitivity. The FSA's Committee on Toxicity evaluated the results at its meeting in October 2013, and determined that "the results presented did not indicate any need for action to protect the health of the public."

The European Food Safety Authority (EFSA) commenced a re-evaluation of aspartame as part of the systematic re-evaluation of all food additives authorized in the EU prior to 20 January 2009. In May 2011, EFSA was asked by the European Commission to bring forward the full re-evaluation of the safety of aspartame (E 951), which was previously planned for completion by 2020. In September 2011, the EFSA made all 600 datasets it is using in its full re-evaluation available publicly. This includes previously unpublished scientific data, "including the 112 original studies on aspartame which were submitted to support the request for authorization of aspartame in Europe in the early 1980s." On January 8, 2013, the EFSA released its draft report, which found that aspartame and its metabolites "pose no toxicity concern for consumers at current levels of exposure. The current Acceptable Daily Intake (ADI) is considered to be safe for the general population and consumer exposure to aspartame is below this ADI."

== Ramazzini cancer studies ==
The Cesare Maltoni Cancer Research Center of the European Ramazzini Foundation of Oncology and Environmental Sciences (ERF) published studies claiming aspartame increases several malignancies in rodents, concluding it a potential carcinogen at normal dietary doses. An open letter from the Center for Science in the Public Interest (CSPI) to the FDA endorsed by thirteen occupational safety and health experts expressed the ERF studies merited reevaluation of aspartame's safety in humans.

After reviewing the foundation's claims, the EFSA and the FDA discounted the study results finding significant methodological issues as reason to retain their previously established acceptable daily intake levels for aspartame. Incomplete release of all data, including pathology slides, by the ERF restricted FDA and EFSA review. Based upon the data provided, the ERF's published conclusions were not supportable. The regulatory agencies Health Canada and the British Committee on Carcinogenicity of Chemicals in Food, Consumer Products and the Environment likewise found the methodological problems in the research justified rejecting the claims and retaining established policy.

Contemporaneous with the FDA and ESFA reviews, the Ajinomoto Company, Inc.—a developer of aspartame—commissioned a review through the safety and regulatory consulting firm, Burdock Group. A blind safety review by a ten-member, international panel of experts (Magnuson) of the scientific literature concurred with the regulatory agency evaluations finding many flaws in the study's design, implementation, and conclusions. These included unspecified composition of the "Corticella" diet and method of adding aspartame, leading to possible nutritional deficiencies; a contamination issue from unspecified aspartame storage conditions and handling; ignoring several industry standards—lack of animal randomization, use of the institute's randomly bred lines that remained pathogen carriers as opposed to readily available pathogen-free animals, use of full-life animals resulting in age variation at death and comparing those animals to younger controls, and both high-density housing and housing of different animal groups in different conditions; an unusually high incidence of confounding infections known to cause lymphoid neoplasmas and other lesions earlier and at greater rates in the test species; pooling of tumors (lymphomas and leukemias) from different tissue types despite standing research that induced tumors "can and should be differentiated from naturally occurring tumors"; insufficient/incomplete/conflicting methodology and data collection/reporting in multiple areas; and the U.S. National Toxicology Program's finding that the ERF had misdiagnosed hyperplasias as malignancies. Finding comprehensive contradiction in the research literature of any reasonable danger, in combination with the ERF's design and implementation issues, Magnuson concluded the research did not constitute credible evidence for the carcinogenicity of aspartame. Another review criticized the ERF for relying on "science by press conference" with its release of results through the media before being published in a proper peer-reviewed journal, thus helping fuel the controversy and publicity about the study in the media.

The EFSA evaluated other studies published by the ERF in 2010, finding continued multiple, significant design flaws prohibiting interpretation and being insufficient to influence reconsideration of the aspartame controversy.

== 2023 classification as possibly carcinogenic ==
In July 2023, scientists for the International Agency for Research on Cancer (IARC) of the World Health Organization (WHO) concluded that there was "limited evidence" for aspartame causing cancer in humans, classifying the sweetener as possibly carcinogenic. The Joint FAO/WHO Expert Committee on Food Additives (JECFA) stated that the limited evidence assessment confirmed there was no reason to change the recommended acceptable daily intake level of 40 mg per kg of body weight per day, reaffirming the safety of consuming aspartame within this limit.

The US Food and Drug Administration (FDA) responded to the report by stating that "Aspartame being labeled by IARC as 'possibly carcinogenic to humans' does not mean that aspartame is actually linked to cancer. The FDA disagrees with IARC's conclusion that these studies support classifying aspartame as a possible carcinogen to humans. FDA scientists reviewed the scientific information included in IARC's review in 2021 when it was first made available and identified significant shortcomings in the studies on which IARC relied."

== See also ==
- Canderel
- Equal (sweetener)
- NutraSweet
