= Canderel =

Brand of artificial sweetener

The Canderel logo

Canderel is a brand of artificial sweetener made mainly from aspartame. Canderel is marketed by The Merisant Company, a global corporation with headquarters in Chicago, Illinois, also Switzerland, Mexico, the United Kingdom, and Australia.

Canderel was first marketed in France in 1979. The name "Canderel" is a combination of candi (or sugar cane) and airelles – the French word for bilberries.

- "Canderel granular" ingredients: maltodextrin, aspartame, acesulfame potassium, flavouring.
- "Canderel tablets" ingredients: lactose, aspartame, acesulfame potassium, leucine, cross-linked CMC, flavouring.

Canderel is said to be interchangeable with sugar in a 1 to 10 mass ratio.

== Aspartame-containing products made by NutraSweet / Merisant ==
- Canderel - sold in Asia, Europe, the Middle East and Africa, and Mexico. It is the leading aspartame-based sweetener in France (where it was launched in 1979) and the United Kingdom (since 1983).
- Equal - first sold in the United States in 1982, this brand is also sold in Australia and India.
- EqualSweet - sold in Argentina
- NutraSweet - used as an ingredient in many processed foods, drinks and tablets, in 1997 it also began to be marketed as a table sweetener in the United States.

== See also ==
- Aspartame
- Aspartame controversy
- Sugar substitute
