= Cosmetotextile =

Textiles designed to release cosmetic product

Cosmetotextiles or cosmetic textiles merge cosmetics and textiles through the process of micro-encapsulation. According to the Bureau de Normalisation des Industries Textiles et de l'Habillement (BNITH), “a cosmetotextile is a textile consumer article containing durably a cosmetic product which is released over time.” Cosmetic textiles currently offered on the market claim to be moisturizing, perfumed, cellulite reducing and body slimming.

Cosmetotextiles are impregnated with a finish composed of solid microcapsules, each holding a specific amount of cosmetic substance meant to be released totally and instantly on the human body. Cosmetotextiles currently offered on the market claim to be moisturising, perfumed, cellulite reducing or body slimming.

The release pattern of the microcapsules on cosmetotextiles is triggered by an impact, most likely friction or pressure between the body and fabric, breaking the capsules into fragments and liberating the cosmetic properties. The release can also be triggered by sweat, temperature, and rubbing.

Recent studies have started to question the nature of the microcapsules’ shells and their toxicity impact or possible allergic reactions on humans. Because shell residues and excessive irregular amounts of substance are left on the skin surface after liberation, micro-encapsulation is more and more preferred for applications that are not in direct contact with the human body, while the dermotextile technology, using natural based micro-particles as cosmetic carriers instead of microcapsules, is slowly taking over the skincare field.

Sometimes, micro-encapsulation is still widely used in the smart textiles area and offers optimal results when applied to diffuse a substance into the environment like perfume or to act as a protective barrier against external elements.
