= Dermotextile =

Dermotextile is a natural and visual alternative to cosmetotextile in merging selected skincare active ingredients to different types of support like textiles. With the dermotextile technology, textiles are printed with a continuous controlled release system composed of bio-based microparticles carrying dispersed skincare actives intended for cosmetic, therapeutic, pharmaceutical or medical use. The continuous release system imprinted creates a visual pattern that, with use, will slowly disappear, communicating the efficacy of the transfer onto the skin.

Natural body movements, the surface’s Ph, temperature or humidity can serve as trigger elements to liberate the skincare actives confined in the microparticles. As they slowly dissolve in reaction to the organism’s needs, the content is released homogeneously and in the required quantity on the body’s surface. The biomimetic ingredients forming the microparticles promote an efficient absorption of the active ingredients by the skin.

Developed to cleanse, protect, preserve or modify the external aspect of the human body like skin or hair, dermotextiles confer a uniform and deep penetration into the tissues’ surface, leaving no residue.
