= 1,6-Dichloro-1,6-dideoxyfructose =

Names
- IUPAC name 1,6-Dichloro-1,6-dideoxy-D-fructose
- Systematic IUPAC name (3S,4S,5S)-1,6-Dichloro-3,4,5-trihydroxyhexan-2-one

Identifiers
CAS Number	69414-08-0
3D model (JSmol)	Interactive image
ChemSpider	2339136
PubChem CID	3081555
UNII	4V097WM1A8
CompTox Dashboard (EPA)	DTXSID50219569
- InChI: InChI=1S/C6H10Cl2O4/c7-1-3(9)5(11)6(12)4(10)2-8/h3,5-6,9,11-12H,1-2H2/t3-,5-,6-/m1/s1 Key: MLQSSVPAOPJIFW-UYFOZJQFSA-N
- SMILES: C([C@H]([C@H]([C@@H](C(=O)CCl)O)O)O)Cl

Properties
Chemical formula	C_{6}H_{10}Cl_{2}O_{4}
Molar mass	217.04 g·mol^{−1}
- Except where otherwise noted, data are given for materials in their standard state (at 25 °C [77 °F], 100 kPa). Infobox references

1,6-Dichloro-1,6-dideoxyfructose (dichlorodideoxyfructose) is chlorinated derivative of the sugar fructose. It is one of the two components believed to comprise the disaccharide sucralose, a commercial sugar substitute.

== Metabolism ==
In mammals, 1,6-dichloro-1,6-dideoxyfructose is metabolized in the liver and erythrocytes by a reaction with glutathione that replaces one of the chlorine atoms, forming 6-chlorofructos-1-yl glutathione (or chlorofructosyl glutathione).
