= Dextrose equivalent =

Amount of reducing sugars in a sugar product

Dextrose equivalent values for selected materials
| Carbohydrate | Dextrose Equivalent (DE) |
|---|---|
| Starch | ~0% |
| Dextrins | 1–13% |
| Maltodextrins | 3–20% |
| Glucose syrups | ≥20% |
| Dextrose (glucose) | 100% |

Dextrose equivalent (DE) is a measure of the amount of reducing sugars present in a sugar product, expressed as a percentage on a dry basis relative to dextrose. The dextrose equivalent gives an indication of the average degree of polymerisation (DP) for starch sugars. As a rule of thumb, DE × DP = 120.

In all glucose polymers, from the native starch to glucose syrup, the molecular chain ends with a reducing sugar, containing a free aldehyde in its linear form. As the starch is hydrolysed, the molecules become shorter and more reducing sugars are present. Therefore, the dextrose equivalent describes the degree of conversion of starch to dextrose. The standard method of determining the dextrose equivalent is the Lane-Eynon titration, based on the reduction of copper(II) sulfate in an alkaline tartrate solution, an application of Fehling's test.

Examples:

- A maltodextrin with a DE of 10 would have 10% of the reducing power of dextrose which has a DE of 100.
- Maltose, a disaccharide made of two glucose (dextrose) molecules, has a DE of 52, correcting for the water loss in molecular weight when the two molecules are combined. Glucose (dextrose) has a molecular mass of 180, while water has a molecular mass of 18. For each 2 glucose monomers binding, a water molecule is removed.

Therefore, the molecular mass of a glucose polymer can be calculated by using the formula (180*n – 18*(n-1)) with n the DP (degree of polymerisation) of the glucose polymer. The DE can be calculated as 100*(180 / Molecular mass( glucose polymer)). In this example the DE is calculated as 100*(180/(180*2-18*1)) = 52.

- Sucrose actually has a DE of zero even though it is a disaccharide, because both reducing groups of the monosaccharides that make it are connected, so there are no remaining reducing groups.

Because different reducing sugars (e.g. fructose and glucose) have different sweetness, it is incorrect to assume that there is any direct relationship between dextrose equivalent and sweetness.

== Uses ==
Dextrose equivalent is used to understand how different sugar products will affect:

- Crystallization prevention (higher starch content reduces ability of sugars to crystallize, therefore improving shelf stability)
- Viscosity (higher starch content sugars are more viscous)
- Water activity (small monosaccharides tend to be more hygroscopic)
- Sweetness (starches are less sweet)
- Caramelization (through the maillard reaction)
