= Health scare =

Social phenomenon

A health scare can be broadly defined as a social phenomenon whereby the public at large comes to fear some threat to health, based on suppositions which are nearly always not well-founded.

In 2009, an ABC News article listed "The Top 10 Health Scares of the Decade": "Some of these threats turned out to be almost nonexistent. Others were arguably overblown. Some caused widespread harm." They listed the following scares:

- Swine flu (H1N1)
- Bisphenol A (BPA)
- Lead paint on toys from China
- Trans fats
- Bird flu (H5N1)
- Severe acute respiratory syndrome (SARS)
- Methicillin-resistant Staphylococcus aureus (MRSA)
- Hormone replacement therapy (HRT)
- Anthrax
- Cell phones

== See also ==
- List of health scares
- Health crisis
- Aspartame controversy
- Dental amalgam controversy
- Thiomersal and vaccines
- Water fluoridation controversy
- COVID-19
