= Glucose syrup =

Syrup made from the hydrolysis of starch

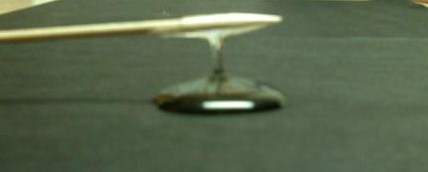
Glucose syrup on a black surface

Glucose syrup, also known as confectioner's glucose, is a syrup made from the hydrolysis of starch. Glucose is a sugar. Maize (corn) is commonly used as the source of the starch in the United States where the syrup is called "corn syrup", but glucose syrup is also made from potatoes and wheat, and less often from barley, rice and cassava.

Glucose syrup containing over 90% glucose is used in industrial fermentation, but syrups used in confectionery contain varying amounts of glucose, maltose and higher oligosaccharides, depending on the grade, and can typically contain 10% to 43% glucose. Glucose syrup is used in foods to sweeten, soften texture and add volume. By converting some glucose in corn syrup into fructose (using an enzymatic process), a sweeter product, high fructose corn syrup can be produced.

Glucose syrup was first made in 1811 in Russia by Gottlieb Kirchhoff using heat and sulfuric acid.

== Types ==
Depending on the method used to hydrolyse the starch and on the extent to which the hydrolysis reaction has been allowed to proceed, different grades of glucose syrup are produced, which have different characteristics and uses. The syrups are broadly categorised according to their dextrose equivalent (DE). The further the hydrolysis process proceeds, the more reducing sugars are produced, and the higher the DE. Depending on the process used, glucose syrups with different compositions, and hence different technical properties, can have the same DE.

=== Confectioner's syrup ===
The original glucose syrups were manufactured by acid hydrolysis of corn starch at high temperature and pressure. The typical product had a DE of 42, but quality was variable due to the difficulty of controlling the reaction. Higher DE syrups made by acid hydrolysis tend to have a bitter taste and a dark colour, due to the production of hydroxymethylfurfural and other byproducts.^{p. 26} This type of product is now manufactured using a continuous converting process and is still widely used due to the low cost of acid hydrolysis. The sugar profile of a confectioner's syrup can also be mimicked by enzymatic hydrolysis. A typical confectioner's syrup contains 19% glucose, 14% maltose, 11% maltotriose and 56% higher molecular mass carbohydrates.^{p. 464} A typical 42 DE syrup has about half the sweetness of sugar,^{p. 71} and increasing DE leads to increased sweetness, with a 63 DE syrup being about 70%, and pure dextrose (100 DE) about 80% as sweet as sugar.^{p. 71}

=== High-maltose glucose syrups ===
By using β-amylase or fungal α-amylase, glucose syrups containing over 50% maltose, or even over 70% maltose (extra-high-maltose syrup) can be produced.^{p. 465} This is possible because these enzymes remove two glucose units (i.e. one maltose molecule) at a time from the end of the starch molecule. High-maltose glucose syrup has a great advantage in the production of hard candy: at a given moisture level and temperature, a maltose solution has a lower viscosity than a glucose solution, but will still set to a hard product. Maltose is also less humectant than glucose, so candy produced with high-maltose syrup will not become sticky as easily as candy produced with a standard glucose syrup.^{p. 81}

== Commercial preparation ==
Irrespective of the feedstock or the method used for hydrolysis, certain steps are common to the production of glucose syrup:

=== Preparation ===
Before conversion of starch to glucose can begin, the starch must be separated from the plant material. This includes removing fibre and protein (which can be valuable by-products, for example wheat or maize gluten^{p. 22}). Protein produces off-flavours and colours due to the Maillard reaction, and fibre is insoluble and has to be removed to allow the starch to become hydrated. The plant material also needs to be ground as part of this process to expose the starch to the water.

=== Soaking ===
The starch needs to be swelled to allow the enzymes or acid to act upon it. When grain is used, sulfur dioxide is added to prevent spoilage.

=== Gelatinization ===
By heating the ground, cleaned feedstock, starch gelatinization takes place: the intermolecular bonds of the starch molecules are broken down, allowing the hydrogen bonding sites to engage more water. This irreversibly dissolves the starch granule, so the chains begin to separate into an amorphous form. This prepares the starch for hydrolysis.

=== Hydrolysis ===
Glucose syrup can be produced by acid hydrolysis, enzyme hydrolysis, or a combination of the two. Currently, a variety of options are available.

Formerly, glucose syrup was only produced by combining corn starch with dilute hydrochloric acid, and then heating the mixture under pressure. Currently, glucose syrup is mainly produced by first adding the enzyme α-amylase to a mixture of corn starch and water. α-amylase is secreted by various species of the bacterium Bacillus; the enzyme is isolated from the liquid in which the bacteria are grown. The enzyme breaks the starch into oligosaccharides, which are then broken into glucose molecules by adding the enzyme glucoamylase, known also as "γ-amylase". Glucoamylase is secreted by various species of the fungus Aspergillus; the enzyme is isolated from the liquid in which the fungus is grown. The glucose can then be transformed into fructose by passing the glucose through a column that is loaded with the enzyme D-xylose isomerase, an enzyme that is isolated from the growth medium of any of several bacteria.

=== Clarification ===
After hydrolysis, the dilute syrup can be passed through columns to remove impurities, improving its colour and stability.

=== Evaporation ===
The dilute glucose syrup is finally evaporated under vacuum to raise the solids concentration.

== Uses ==
Its major uses in commercially prepared food products are as a thickener, sweetener, and humectant (an ingredient that retains moisture and thus maintains a food's freshness). Glucose syrup is also widely used in the manufacture of a variety of candy products.

In the United States, domestically produced corn syrup and high-fructose corn syrup (HFCS) are often used in American-made processed and mass-produced foods, candies, soft drinks and fruit drinks to increase profit margins.

Glucose syrup was the primary corn sweetener in the United States prior to the expanded use of HFCS production. HFCS is a variant in which other enzymes are used to convert some glucose into fructose. The resulting syrup is sweeter and more soluble. Corn syrup is also available as a retail product.

Glucose syrup is often used as part of the mixture that goes into creating fake blood for films and television. Blood mixtures that contain glucose syrup are very popular among independent films and film makers, as it is cheap and easy to obtain.

== See also ==
- High-fructose corn syrup
- List of syrups
- Mizuame
- Molasses
