= Formaldehyde (disambiguation) =

Formaldehyde is an organic compound with the formula CH_{2}O.

Formaldehyde may also refer to:

- Formaldehyde (album), an album by the rock band Terrorvision
- "Formaldehyde" (song), a 2013 single by the band Editors
- Formaldehyde resin (disambiguation)

== See also ==
- Formaldehyde releaser
