= 4-Chloro-4-deoxygalactose =

Names
- IUPAC name 4-Chloro-4-deoxy-D-galacto-hexose
- Systematic IUPAC name (2R,3R,4S,5R)-4-Chloro-2,3,5,6-tetrahydroxyhexanal

Identifiers
CAS Number	61489-30-3
3D model (JSmol)	Interactive image
ChemSpider	21376527
PubChem CID	87593241
- InChI: InChI=1S/C6H11ClO5/c7-5(3(10)1-8)6(12)4(11)2-9/h2-6,8,10-12H,1H2/t3-,4+,5+,6-/m1/s1 Key: KWXIWFADURXYFY-DPYQTVNSSA-N
- SMILES: C([C@H]([C@@H]([C@@H]([C@H](C=O)O)O)Cl)O)O

Properties
Chemical formula	C_{6}H_{11}ClO_{5}
Molar mass	198.60 g·mol^{−1}
- Except where otherwise noted, data are given for materials in their standard state (at 25 °C [77 °F], 100 kPa). Infobox references

4-Chloro-4-deoxygalactose (chlorodeoxygalactose) is chlorinated derivative of the sugar galactose. It is one of the two components comprising the disaccharide sucralose, a commercial sugar substitute. It is a hydrolysis product when sucralose is degraded.
