= James M. Schlatter =

American chemist (1930–2019)

- Born: July 27, 1930; Brazil, Indiana, United States
- Died: November 15, 2019 (aged 89); Avon, Indiana, United States
- Occupation: Chemist
- Known for: Discovering aspartame

James M. Schlatter (27 July 1930 – 15 November 2019) was an American chemist. He is known for discovering aspartame.

== Biography ==
James M. Schlatter was born on 27 July 1930 in Brazil, Indiana to Howard Schlatter and Bertha Schwab.

As a child, he attended the Brazil Lutheran Church. He graduated Brazil Senior High School in 1948 and DePauw University in 1952. In 1954, he obtained a master's degree in chemistry at Indiana University.

He served in the U.S Army. He worked as a chemist for G. D. Searle & Company.

In December 1965, Schlatter unintentionally discovered aspartame while working on an anti-ulcer drug. Aspartic acid and phenylalanine had been synthesized by Dr. Mazur, and Schlatter then heated the result in a flask with methanol. The mixture bumped onto the outside of the flask, and then got on Schlatter's fingers. When he later licked his finger to pick up a piece of paper, he "noticed a very strong, sweet taste". He took a little bit of the crystallized aspartyl-phenylalanine methyl ester (aspartame) and tasted it, and found that it was the same substance he had earlier tasted.

Schlatter died on 15 November 2019 at his residence in Avon, Indiana.
