= Formaldehyde resin =

Formaldehyde resins are synthetic resins based on formaldehyde together with a co-monomer, such as:

- Melamine formaldehyde (MF)
- Urea-formaldehyde (UF)
- Phenol formaldehyde (PF)

== See also ==
- Formaldehyde (disambiguation)
