= Merisant =

American sweetener manufacturer

- Type: Subsidiary
- Industry: Sugar substitutes
- Headquarters: Chicago, Illinois
- Area served: Worldwide
- Key people: Albert Manzone
- Products: Equal; Canderel; PureVia
- Parent: MacAndrews & Forbes
- Divisions: Whole Earth Sweetener Company
- Website: www.merisant.com

Merisant is an American manufacturer of zero/low-calorie sugar substitutes. It is a wholly owned subsidiary of MacAndrews & Forbes and is headquartered in Chicago, Illinois. Merisant markets brands in over 90 countries including Equal and Canderel, as well as natural sweeteners PureVia and Whole Earth featuring stevia and monkfruit extract. In 2021, Merisant was ranked 12th on the Top 50 Global Sweetener Companies list by FoodTalks.

The company was formed from Monsanto Company's tabletop sweetener business, which was acquired by a group of investors in 2000. It was acquired by MacAndrews & Forbes in 2014.

In April 2014, Merisant made a distribution pact with Piramal Enterprises to distribute Equal in India.

In January 2019, Merisant launched Sugarly Sweet range of sweeteners exclusively for Amazon as part of the Amazon Accelerator Program, bringing a new brand from development to launch in just 90 days.

In June 2020, Whole Earth Brands acquired Merisant from Flavor Holdings.
