= Dry water =

Water-air emulsion that combines water droplets and silica coating

Dry water or empty water, a form of "powdered liquid", is an air–water emulsion in which water droplets are surrounded by a silica coating. Dry water consists of 95% liquid water, but the silica coating prevents the water droplets from combining and turning back into a bulk liquid. The result is a white powder.

== Discovery and preparation ==
Dry water was first patented in 1968 and quickly found use in the cosmetic industry. In 2006, new work with dry water from the University of Hull increased interest in its potential use in other fields.

Dry water can be made by blending a mixture of silicon dioxide powder with water.

== Applications ==
Certain gases, when mixed with dry water, combine with the water, which then traps them in a solid clathrate hydrate cage. This presents the possibility that explosive gases could be transported in dry water with a reduced risk of detonation. Dry water was considered for use as a carbon sequestration agent to capture and seal away greenhouse gases from the atmosphere. It can trap four times more carbon dioxide than ordinary water over a similar length of time. Dry water also has applications for the transportation and storage of many dangerous materials. It can be used as a medium for volatile compounds, as materials stored within the dry water can be reduced to powder and stabilized – reducing not only the volatility of the substance, but also its weight for transport. It has also been theorized that dry water could have potential uses in the construction of fuel cells for automobiles due to its ability to store and stabilize very large amounts of volatile gases and materials without permanently binding them. Due to its nature, dry water is classified as an adsorbent material. It has many potential uses in fields where emulsions are used. Recent studies have also found dry water can act as a catalyst.

== See also ==
- Carbon sequestration
- Fuel cell
- Emulsion
- Volatile organic compound
