= Scientific Committee on Food =

Defunct European organization

- Abbreviation: SCF
- Formation: 1974
- Type: INGO
- Official language: English
- Website: SCF Official website

The Scientific Committee on Food (SCF), established in 1974, was the main committee providing the European Commission with scientific advice on food safety. Its responsibilities have been transferred to the European Food Safety Authority (EFSA).

== Purpose and scope ==
The SCF provided the European Commission with independent scientific advice on issues of public health related to food consumption. The commission was required to consult the SCF in the cases laid down by EU legislation, but could also decide to consult it on any other matter relating to food safety or consumer health, in conjunction with other committees. The SCF could also alert the commission to any specific or emerging concern.

Most of the SCF's early activities concerned food additives, but other issues became increasingly important as the scope of EU legislation expanded, including work with flavourings, food contact materials, nutrition, contaminants, novel foods, food hygiene, and natural mineral waters.

== Membership in the SCF ==
The European Commission appointed various independent scientific experts, from across the European Union, to serve as members of the SCF. The main role of the members was to give objective and authoritative advice, spanning a range of food-related issues. The Commission advertised all the posts for the SCF committee, as well as for its other scientific committees. These included experts in the fields of nutrition, toxicology, food hygiene, food technology, microbiology, biotechnology and molecular genetics. In December 1997, the SCF had 17 members.

During each meeting, the SCF members were required to declare if they had any commercial or other interests in the items being discussed. These declarations were later included in the minutes of each meeting, which are now publicly available on the Internet (see below: External links).

== SCF working groups ==
The SCF established 8 working groups covering the following specialized areas:

- Additives
- Contaminants
- Flavourings
- Food contact materials
- Food hygiene and microbiology
- Intake and exposure
- Novel foods and processes
- Nutrition and dietetic foods

Each working group was chaired by an SCF member who regularly reported back to the SCF about the working group's activities and conclusions. The membership of each working group was selected from among SCF members, then supplemented by ad hoc (specific) experts with appropriate expertise, who participated in some meetings, at the request of the European Commission.

== Specific activities ==
After reviewing its handling of the BSE crisis, the European Commission restructured its committees, replacing some and creating new committees. All of these committees were then overseen by the Scientific Steering Committee (formerly the Multi-disciplinary Scientific Committee), which also handled some specific issues such as BSE. The responsibility for all of the advisory scientific committees was also transferred to DG XXIV, which dealt with Consumer Policy and Consumer Health Protection. This transfer was made to preserve the independence of those committees, by separating the tasks of expert advice from the direct policy and legislative parts of the commission.

The SCF's opinion papers (about the issues it had studied) and the minutes of its meetings, can be obtained from the European Commission's website at ec.europa.eu (see below: External links). The opinions of the Scientific Committee on Food were also published by the Publications Office of the European Union, as various reports in the series on Food Science and Techniques.
