= Maltotriose =

- Maltotriose

Names
- IUPAC name α-D-Glucopyranosyl-(1→4)-α-D-glucopyranosyl-(1→4)-D-glucopyranose
- Systematic IUPAC name (2R,3S,4S,5S,6R)-2-[(2R,3R,4R,5R,6R)-4,5-dihydroxy-2-(hydroxymethyl)-6-[(2R,3S,4S,5R)-4,5,6-trihydroxy-2-(hydroxymethyl)oxan-3-yl]oxyoxan-3-yl]oxy-6-(hydroxymethyl)oxane-3,4,5-triol

Identifiers
CAS Number	1109-28-0
3D model (JSmol)	Interactive image
ChEBI	CHEBI:27931
ChEMBL	ChEMBL1234363
ChemSpider	17216092
DrugBank	DB03277
ECHA InfoCard	100.012.886
EC Number	214-174-2
PubChem CID	192826
UNII	639K0T34IK
CompTox Dashboard (EPA)	DTXSID90858850
- InChI: InChI=1S/C18H32O16/c19-1-4-7(22)8(23)12(27)17(31-4)34-15-6(3-21)32-18(13(28)10(15)25)33-14-5(2-20)30-16(29)11(26)9(14)24/h4-29H,1-3H2/t4-,5-,6-,7-,8+,9-,10-,11-,12-,13-,14-,15-,16?,17-,18-/m1/s1 Key: FYGDTMLNYKFZSV-DZOUCCHMSA-N; InChI=1/C18H32O16/c19-1-4-7(22)8(23)12(27)17(31-4)34-15-6(3-21)32-18(13(28)10(15)25)33-14-5(2-20)30-16(29)11(26)9(14)24/h4-29H,1-3H2/t4-,5-,6-,7-,8+,9-,10-,11-,12-,13-,14-,15-,16u,17-,18-/m1/s1 Key: FYGDTMLNYKFZSV-LALNNVAPBU
- SMILES: O[C@@H]3[C@@H](O)[C@H](O)[C@@H](CO)O[C@@H]3O[C@@H]2[C@@H](CO)O[C@H](O[C@H]1[C@H](O)[C@@H](O)C(O)O[C@@H]1CO)[C@H](O)[C@H]2O

Properties
Chemical formula	C_{18}H_{32}O_{16}
Molar mass	504.438 g/mol
- Except where otherwise noted, data are given for materials in their standard state (at 25 °C [77 °F], 100 kPa). verify (what is ?) Infobox references

Maltotriose is a trisaccharide (three-part sugar) consisting of three glucose molecules linked with α-1,4 glycosidic bonds.

It is most commonly produced by the digestive enzyme alpha-amylase (a common enzyme in human saliva) on amylose in starch. The creation of both maltotriose and maltose during this process is due to the random manner in which alpha amylase hydrolyses α-1,4 glycosidic bonds.

It is the shortest chain oligosaccharide that can be classified as maltodextrin.

Maltotriose obtained from starch is a common component of ice cream.
