= Maltodextrin =

Polysaccharide of glucose

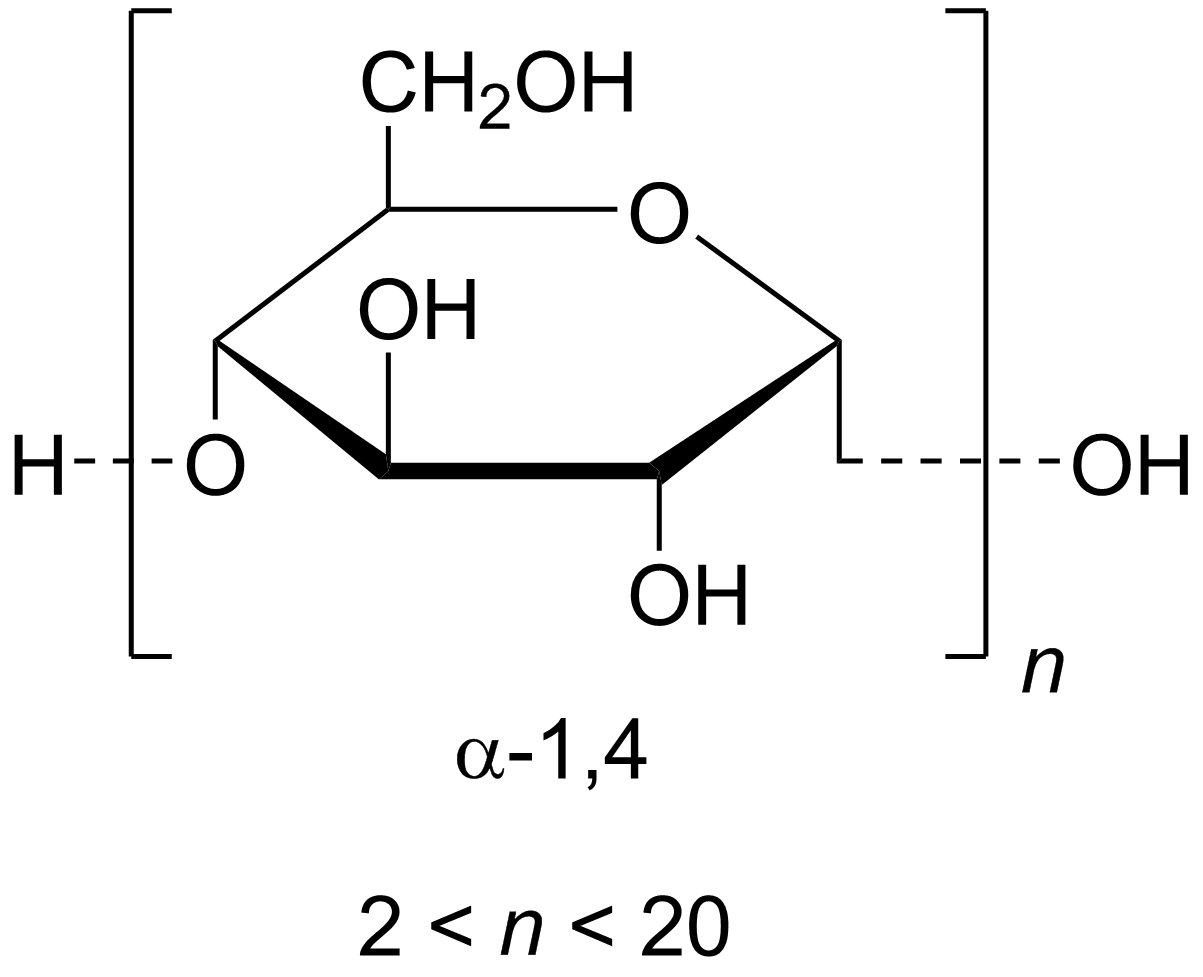

Identifiers
CAS Number	9050-36-6
ChemSpider	None
ECHA InfoCard	100.029.934
EC Number	232–940–4
UNII	7CVR7L4A2D
CompTox Dashboard (EPA)	DTXSID5027720

Properties
Chemical formula	C_{6n}H_{(10n+2)}O_{(5n+1)}
Molar mass	Variable
Appearance	White powder
Density	2
Solubility in water	Free soluble or readily dispersible in water
Solubility	Slightly soluble to insoluble in anhydrous alcohol

Hazards
NFPA 704 (fire diamond)	1 1 0
- Except where otherwise noted, data are given for materials in their standard state (at 25 °C [77 °F], 100 kPa). verify (what is ?) Infobox references

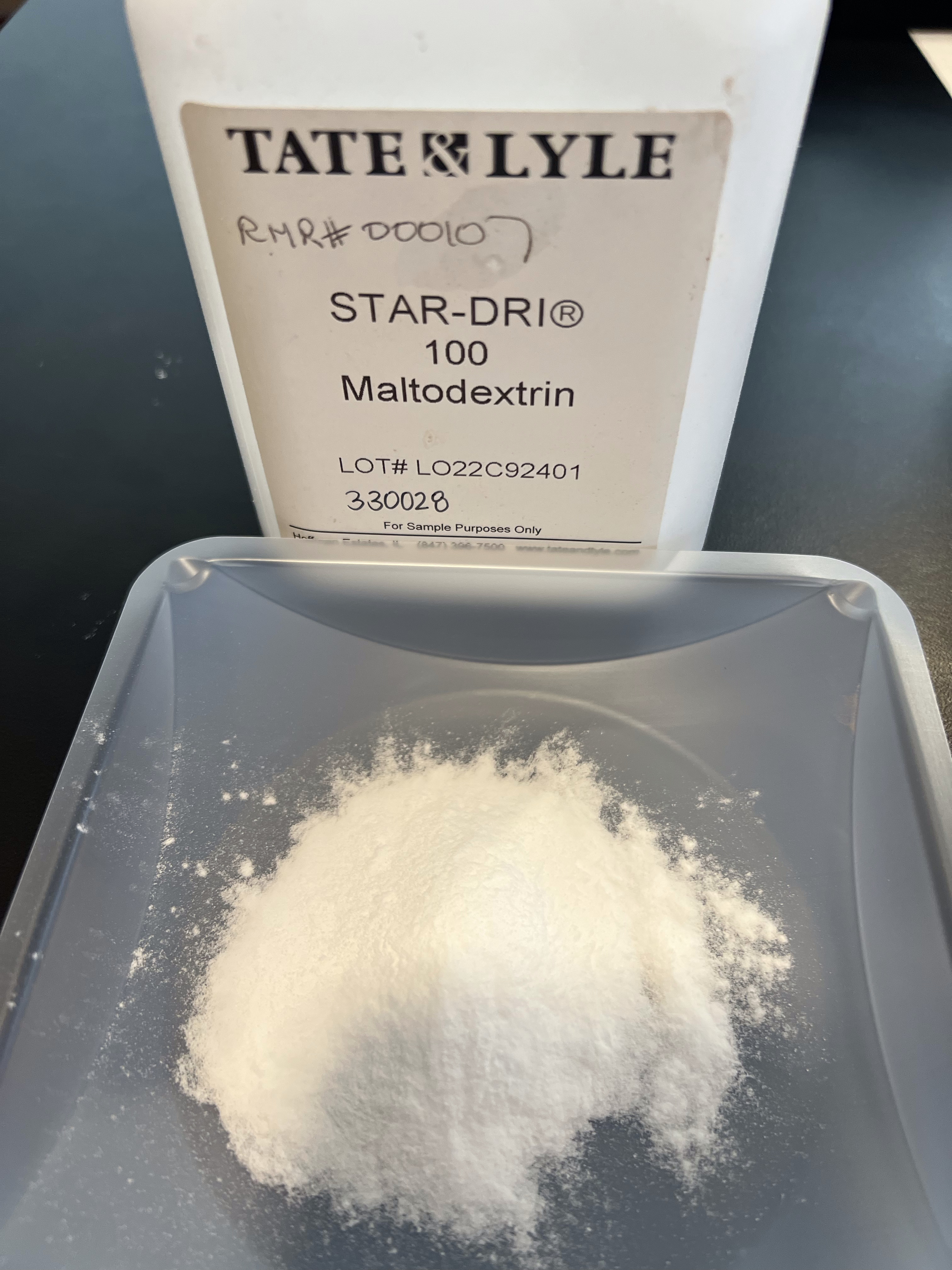
Maltodextrin powder

Maltodextrin is a name shared by two different families of chemicals. Both families are glucose polymers (also called dextrose polymers or dextrins), but have little chemical or nutritional similarity.

The digestible maltodextrins (or simply maltodextrins) are manufactured as white solids derived from chemical processing of plant starches. They are used as food additives, which are digested rapidly, providing glucose as food energy. They are generally recognized as safe (GRAS) for food and beverage manufacturing in numerous products. Due to their rapid production of glucose, digestible maltodextrins are potential risks for people with diabetes.

The digestion-resistant maltodextrins (also called resistant maltodextrins) are defined as nutritional food additives due to their ability upon fermentation in the colon to yield short-chain fatty acids, which contribute to gastrointestinal health. Digestion-resistant maltodextrins are also white solids resulting from the chemical processing of plant starches, but are processed using methods specifically to be resistant to digestion. They are used as ingredients in many consumer products, such as low-calorie sweeteners, and are considered GRAS.

Consumers may find the shared name for different maltodextrin food additives to be confusing.

== Definition ==
Digestible maltodextrins are well-defined chemically, understood, and documented. By contrast, digestion-resistant maltodextrins – being the newer and more complex chemical family – are less defined chemically, researched and documented.

Maltodextrins are classified by a dextrose equivalent (DE), a number between 3 and 20 that corresponds to the number of free chain ends in a certain sample. A lower DE value means the polymer chains are longer (contain more glucose units) whereas a higher DE value means the chains are shorter. This is an inverse concept compared with the degree of polymerization of the chain. A high-DE maltodextrin is sweeter, more soluble, and has lower heat resistance. Above DE 20, the European Union's CN code calls it glucose syrup; at DE 10 or lower, the customs CN code nomenclature classifies maltodextrins as dextrins.

=== Digestible maltodextrin ===
Maltodextrins consist of D-glucose units connected in chains of variable length. The glucose units are primarily linked with α(1→4) glycosidic bonds, like those seen in the linear derivative of glycogen (after the removal of α1,6- branching). Commercial maltodextrin is typically composed of a mixture of chains that vary from three to 17 glucose units long. Properties of maltodextrin, such as sweetness, viscosity, and texture, can be manipulated during manufacturing by altering the extent of starch hydrolysis.

Maltodextrins are digested into glucose units, contributing a food energy value of 4 calories per gram (or 16 kilojoules per gram). Maltodextrin manufacturing produces a high-purity product with microbiological safety. It can be used in varied food, beverage, sports, and baked products.

=== Digestion-resistant maltodextrin ===
Digestion-resistant maltodextrins are a chemical family much larger than the family of digestible maltodextrins. A definition of a digestion-resistant maltodextrin is: "Resistant maltodextrin/dextrin is a glucose oligosaccharide. Resistant maltodextrin and dextrin products are composed of non-digestible oligosaccharides of glucose molecules that are joined by digestible linkages and non-digestible α-1,2 and α-1,3 linkages." The chemical is of greater structural complexity than a digestible maltodextrin. The two families of maltodextrins have little in common chemically or nutritionally.

Names used to identify digestion-resistant maltodextrin as an ingredient in foods for regulatory purposes include soluble fiber, resistant dextrin, or dextrin. Names may include the food starch used to fabricate the ingredient.

The chemical family has had a history of changes in classification. As of 2023, a digestion-resistant maltodextrin is considered a resistant dextrin and a resistant starch of type 5. (Note: The difference in classification is of little chemical significance. It refers to the material source for manufacturing. Dextrin is a product of starch. Maltodextrin is a product of starch or dextrin, but is neither a starch nor a dextrin.) Another study contrasted resistant dextrins and resistant maltodextrins, finding them to differ chemically and functionally. In that study, the final maltodextrin product required further processing of the resistant dextrin. The chemical family is effectively defined by the food starch and the manufacturing process, both of which may vary according to manufacturing preferences.

The digestion-resistant maltodextrin ingredient has several properties exploited in food or beverage manufacturing: it is a low-moisture (5% water), free-flowing, fine white powder that disperses readily in water; it is clear in solution with low viscosity; it is odorless, slightly acidic, and has a bland flavor; it is 90% dietary fiber. The average molecular mass of the digestion-resistant maltodextrin molecule is 2,000 daltons.

Digestion-resistant maltodextrin is a soluble (fermentable) dietary fiber with numerous non-starch glycosidic bonds, allowing it to pass through the digestive tract unchanged in physical properties without undergoing digestion, supplying no food energy. In the colon, it is a prebiotic fiber fermented by gut microbiota, resulting in the formation of short-chain fatty acids contributing to gastrointestinal health.

== History ==
After development of food ingredients from starch sources around 1950, digestible maltodextrins were first produced between 1967 and 1973. Digestion-resistant maltodextrins were developed in the 1990s from studies of starch nutrition, leading to the definition of resistant starch. This was accompanied by the detection of digestion-resistant components in food products and manufacturing methods. Some sources typically referred to digestible maltodextrin when describing maltodextrin without further definition of which maltodextrin was used.

== Manufacturing ==
=== Digestible maltodextrin production ===
Maltodextrin can be enzymatically derived from any starch, such as corn, potato, rice or cassava. In the United States, this starch is usually corn; in Europe, it is common to use wheat. A food starch is boiled. The resulting paste is treated with a combination of acid and enzymes to produce maltodextrins.

=== Digestion-resistant maltodextrin production ===
Digestion-resistant maltodextrins are manufactured by a process superficially similar to that for digestible maltodextrins. A food starch is exposed to a combination of heat, acid and enzymes before purification. Part of the process deliberately resembles human digestion – thus, the result is digestion-resistant by design. Neither the food starch source nor the process is standardized.

A step in one method of preparing digestion-resistant maltodextrins is roasting the plant starch in acid conditions. The process breaks the starch molecules into small units, which then recombine with different, more digestion-resistant bonds. This is called pyrodextrinization and is used in the form of resistant maltodextrin by the FDA. This type is also considered GRAS in the US, according to the manufacturer.

Enzymes can be used to break starches apart as an alternative to roasting. The EFSA adopts a wider definition of "resistant maltodextrin" encompassing pyrolysis and enzymatic treatment. This type is known as "resistant dextrin" in the GRAS notice.

A list of 14 preparation methods included three to four different methods, including microwave heating. Similar methods differed in detail, possibly because methods are optimized for the plant starch source. One study provided a detailed description of a laboratory method for producing digestion-resistant maltodextrins, combining several of the listed preparation methods.

A 2023 review found that use of different starch sources and different manufacturing techniques may produce digestion-resistant maltodextrins with varied properties, concluding that manufacturing methods for digestion-resistant maltodextrin lacked standardization. Another 2023 review of methods examined digestion-resistant maltodextrins from three different starch sources (potato, cassava, and sweet potato) using identical manufacturing techniques. The resulting digestion-resistant maltodextrins were measured to have small physical and chemical differences, such as in formation of dextrin crystals and surface porosity, digestion resistance (80–85%), thermal stabilities, solubility, and formation of pastes. The significance of such differences to the quality of processed foods and health is unknown. A third 2023 study showed maltodextrin digestion rates to be a function of molecular structure.

== Food uses ==
In the European Union, wheat-derived maltodextrin is exempt from wheat allergen labeling, as set out in Annex II of EC Regulation No 1169/2011. In the United States, however, it is not exempt from allergen declaration per the Food Allergen Labeling and Consumer Protection Act, and its effect on a voluntary gluten-free claim must be evaluated on a case-by-case basis per the applicable FDA policy.

=== Digestible maltodextrin ===
Maltodextrin has varied applications for food and beverage processing, including medical food, baby food, hospital food, and sports supplement products. It is also used as a substitute for lactose.

Maltodextrin is used to improve the texture and mouthfeel of food and beverage products, such as potato chips and "light" peanut butter to reduce the fat content. It is an effective flavorant, bulking agent, and sugar substitute.

Maltodextrin is easily digestible and can provide a quick source of food energy. Due to its rapid absorption, maltodextrin is used by athletes as an ingredient in sports drinks or recovery supplements to replenish glycogen stores and enhance performance during prolonged exercise. It can be taken as a dietary supplement in powder form, gel packets, energy drinks or oral rinse. Maltodextrin has a high glycemic index of 110, compared to glucose (100) and table sugar (80).

Maltodextrin can be used to microencapsulate oil, fats, and other liquid flavorings into a free-flowing powder. This protects the insides from oxidation while also allowing instant food powders to be made out of these ingredients. Maltodextrin is water-soluble, so it dissolves away to release the contents when water is added. The same principle is used to make alcohol powder, which turns into an alcoholic drink when water is added.

In the United States, maltodextrin is considered a safe ingredient (GRAS) for food manufacturing.

=== Digestion-resistant maltodextrin ===
Digestion-resistant maltodextrin is included among other sources as functional fiber, meaning its use in foods may provide improved function of the gastrointestinal system. The low molecular weight, low viscosity, high water solubility, and resistance to enzymatic activity allow digestion-resistant maltodextrin to avoid digestion in the gastrointestinal tract. Such properties may be advantageous to add digestion-resistant maltodextrin as a source of fermentable dietary fiber in food manufacturing, while maintaining the sensory qualities of processed foods.

Digestion-resistant maltodextrins, as prebiotic dietary fiber, are additives used in processed foods primarily as bulking agents or with the intent to confer a health effect. The characteristics of digestion-resistant maltodextrins allow them to be added to diverse kinds of food products, such as beverages, dairy products, and desserts.

They are also relatively low-calorie, colorless, odorless and tasteless. They are nontoxic, chemically stable, and nonreactive with other food ingredients over the range of temperatures required for food preparation and storage.

In Europe, the United States, and Canada, industrial digestion-resistant maltodextrin is recognized as a safe ingredient for food manufacturing.

== Health research ==
=== Digestible maltodextrin ===
Due to its liberation of glucose molecules when digested, maltodextrin can cause a rapid increase in blood sugar levels when consumed in large quantities, especially for individuals with diabetes or insulin resistance. As maltodextrin is quickly digested and absorbed, excessive consumption may contribute to weight gain, impaired insulin sensitivity, and elevated blood lipids, if not balanced with an appropriate lifestyle or diet.

=== Digestion-resistant maltodextrin ===
Digestion-resistant maltodextrin is a fermentable dietary fiber under research for its potential to lower the risk of hypoglycemia, obesity, and associated disorders of metabolic syndrome. While traversing the colon, digestion-resistant maltodextrin is a substrate for producing short-chain fatty acids – the main energy source of cells lining the colon, thereby contributing to health of the gastrointestinal system. Consumption of foods containing digestion-resistant maltodextrin increases the frequency and volume of bowel movements, potentially relieving constipation.

Reviews have concluded that digestion-resistant maltodextrin is classified as a type 5 resistant starch (RS5), a prebiotic dietary fiber having properties that may improve management of diabetes and other disorders of metabolic syndrome. Consumption of food or beverage products containing fermentable dietary fibers, such as digestion-resistant maltodextrin, may cause abdominal discomfort, bloating, and flatulence.

=== Health claim regulation ===
In 2014, a scientific panel for the European Food Safety Authority concluded that manufactured foods containing a commercial digestion-resistant dextrin were eligible for a health claim of reducing post-meal blood glucose levels.

In 2017, Health Canada included digestion-resistant maltodextrin among manufactured sources of dietary fiber having desirable physiological effects eligible for product labeling.

In 2018, the United States FDA issued an industry guidance document stating that foods made with digestion-resistant maltodextrin could be advertised as providing a health benefit from fermentable dietary fiber.

== Other uses ==
Maltodextrin is used to coat pills and tablets, and to formulate powders, in the manufacturing of prescription drugs and dietary supplement products. It is also used as a horticultural insecticide both in the field and in greenhouses. Having no biochemical action, its efficacy is based upon spraying a dilute solution upon the pest insects, whereupon the solution dries, blocks insect spiracles, and causes death by asphyxiation.

== See also ==
- Icodextrin
- Maltose
- Maltotriose
