= MacAndrews & Forbes =

American holding company

MacAndrews & Forbes Incorporated
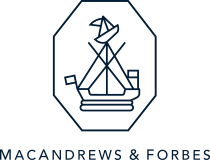
- Type: Private
- Industry: Diversified holding
- Genre: Holding
- Founded: 1850; 176 years ago
- Founders: Edward MacAndrews; William Forbes
- Headquarters: New York City, New York, United States
- Key people: Ronald Perelman (Chairman and CEO); Barry Schwartz (Vice Chairman)
- Products: Cosmetics, vehicles
- Services: Cosmetics and Entertainment to Biotech and Military
- Owner: Ronald Perelman
- Subsidiaries: MacAndrews & Forbes; Allied Security Incorporated; M&F Worldwide (MFW); Revlon Group, Inc.; Scientific Games Corporation; SIGA Technologies Inc; TransTech Pharma
- Website: macandrewsandforbes.com

MacAndrews & Forbes Incorporated is an American diversified holding company wholly owned by billionaire investor Ronald Perelman. Current investments include leading participants across a wide range of industries, from cosmetics and entertainment to biotechnology and military equipment. The principal interests of MacAndrews & Forbes include AM General, Harland Clarke, Merisant, RetailMeNot, Revlon, Scantron, Scientific Games Corporation, SIGA Technologies, Valassis and vTv Therapeutics.

== History ==
=== Group ===
MacAndrews & Forbes & Co. was founded in 1850 by Edward MacAndrews and William Forbes, a distributor of licorice extract and chocolate.

In 1978, Perelman purchased a 40% stake in Cohen-Hatfield Jewelers, and in 1980, Perelman, through Cohen-Hatfield Jewelers, bought MacAndrews & Forbes & Co. Through the purchase, Cohen-Hatfield Jewelers was merged into what became MacAndrews & Forbes Group Inc.

=== Holdings ===
In 1983, Perelman formed MacAndrews & Forbes Holdings, Inc. Perelman started selling bonds to acquire the remaining 66% stake in MacAndrews & Forbes Group Inc. to take MacAndrews & Forbes Group Inc. private.

Also in 1983, MacAndrews acquired Technicolor Inc. Despite the bond debt, in 1984, MacAndrews & Forbes purchased Consolidated Cigar Holdings Ltd. from Gulf & Western Industries, in addition to Video Corporation of America. The Technicolor Inc. divisions were sold off and, in 1988, its core business was sold to Carlton Communications for 6.5 times the purchase price. Using the proceeds from the Technicolor division sell off, MacAndrews & Forbes purchased a 20 percent stake in Compact Video Inc., a television and film syndication company. Ronald Perelman's controlling buyout of Compact Video was in 1986.

In 1989, Perelman acquired New World Entertainment, with David Charnay's Four Star Television becoming a unit of Ronald Perelman's Compact Video, later that year. Ownership of Compact Video Inc. was increased to 40% in 1989 after the buyout of Four Star International. It was purchased through a golden parachute deal that was negotiated with David Charnay's Acquisition and Ronald Perelman after Charnay was notified of stock purchases made by Perelman in 1989. In 1989, Perelman also acquired New World Entertainment with Four Star becoming a division of New World as part of the transaction. After Compact shut down, its remaining assets, including Four Star International, were folded into MacAndrews & Forbes. By the end of 1989, MacAndrews refinanced the holding companies' junk bonds for standard bank loans. The bulk of New World's film and home video holdings were sold in January 1990 to Trans-Atlantic Pictures, a newly formed production company founded by a consortium of former New World executives.

=== Revlon Group ===
MacAndrews next purchased Pantry Pride Inc., in June 1985. Its three retail supermarket chains were sold off within months.

In 1985, Perelman also took on his biggest deal yet: The Revlon Corporation. Financed with over $700 million in junk bonds from Michael Milken's firm, Drexel Burnham Lambert, Pantry Pride Inc. offered to buy any or all of Revlon's 38.2 million outstanding shares for $47.5 per share when its street price stood at $45 per share. Initially rejected, Perelman repeatedly raised his offer until it reached $53 per share, while fighting Revlon's management every step of the way. Forstmann Little & Company swooped in and offered $56 per share. A brief public bidding war ensued, and Perelman triumphed with an offer of $58 per share. As a result, Perelman paid $1.8 billion to Revlon's shareholders, but he also paid $900 million in other costs associated with the purchase.

After the acquisition, Perelman had Revlon sell four of its divisions: Two were sold for $1 billion, the Vision Care division was sold for $574 million, and, in 1988, the National Health Laboratories division became a publicly owned corporation. Additional makeup lines were purchased for Revlon: Max Factor in 1987 and Betrix in 1989 (they were later sold to Procter & Gamble, in 1991). Despite Perelman's regular cleansing of upper management and injecting millions of dollars into the company, Revlon was unable to turn a profit for several years. As of the first quarter of 2007, it had had one profitable quarter in the previous 32.

By 2012, Revlon was rebounding, and its net income had grown to $51.5 million. As of April 2014, Revlon was trading at $25.45 per share, rising from a low of $1.20 per share in 2007. A major cause of Revlon's financial problems was the debt load stemming from Perelman's purchase of the company.

=== Gillette, Four Star, and the late eighties ===
In 1986, Ronald Perelman made several attempts on behalf of MacAndrews & Forbes to take-over Gillette Company, offering $4.12 billion, and eventually $5.7 billion. In October 1987, Perelman withdrew the last offer. In 1988, Consolidated Cigar was sold. Attempted take overs were targeted at CPC International. Ronald Perelman's controlling buyout of Compact Video was in 1986. Four Star International was purchased through a golden parachute deal that was negotiated with David Charnay's acquisition and Ronald Perelman after Charnay was notified of stock purchases made by Perelman in 1989. After Compact Video shut down, its remaining assets, including Four Star International, were folded into MacAndrews & Forbes. By the end of 1989, MacAndrews refinanced the Holding companies' junk bonds for standard bank loans.

=== Savings and loans ===
Perelman first entered what became known as the Savings & Loan crisis in 1988 when along with Gerald J. Ford he bought five insolvent thrifts with $12.2 billion in assets and $5.1 billion in federal aid for $315 million. The five banks originally operated as a single entity named First Texas Bank, but the name changed to First Gibraltar after about a week. Perelman's turn-around manifested as trimming the payroll, selling branches, and dumping of $2.5 billion of underperforming assets. In 1990, Perelman added San Antonio Savings Association and Sooner Federal to First Gibraltar for $10.1 million and $5.1 million, respectively. The purchase of San Antonio added $1.1 billion of healthy assets, $1.2 billion unhealthy assets, and a $1.3 billion government cash advance to Perelman's larder while Sooner only provided $1.2 billion in assets along with the typical government guarantees. Sooner Federal was not only the last S&L Perelman bought, but the first he sold; In August 1992, he sold the pieces of Sooner to Bank of Oklahoma and Fourth Financial Corporation for $31.4 million. The following month he sold the rest of First Gibraltar to BankAmerica for $110 million, retaining four branches in Plano, Texas and $1.2 billion of assets in the mortgage and property management sectors. He renamed the four branches First Madison. It's unclear how much money Perelman made from his savings & loan deals, but it's estimated that he made anywhere from $600 million to $1.2 billion with most of the profits manifesting as tax breaks elsewhere in his empire. In essence, by owning First Gibraltar he was able to avoid paying hundreds of millions in federal taxes.

Perelman jumped back into the savings & loan game in a big way in 1994 by buying First Nationwide from the Ford Motor Company for $664 million. Ford held onto $1.8 billion of First Nationwide's assets valued at $444 million, two-thirds of which were considered troubled assets, offered to buy back up to $500 million of First Nationwide's other $7.9 billion of assets that went bad in the future, and gave Perelman $50 million to cover potential severance payments. Perelman quickly boosted its portfolio, adding $10 billion worth of mortgages in exchange for a $175 million payment to Resolution Trust Corporation. Before 1995 ended, Perelman added two more thrifts to his collective: SFFed's $4.1 billion of assets for $250 million and Home Federal Financial's $735 million of assets and $662 million of deposits for $70.6 million. Just as quickly as he added assets, branches, and deposits in California, he dumped what he had elsewhere in the country. In 1995 alone he sold off 79 branches with $4.3 billion in deposits spread out across five states. 1996 went a little slower, but not eventfully. He acquired California Federal Bancorp for $1.2 billion, creating the 4th largest thrift in the country with $32.3 billion in assets. In 1997, another $3.3 billion in mortgages were added courtesy of WMC Mortgage but it was an otherwise quiet year for First Nationwide. In 1998, Perelman negotiated a stock swap with Golden State Bancorp to create the third largest thrift in the country with $50 billion of assets. The deal left Golden State's shareholders the majority, but Perelman's camp still controlled the company. Everything remained quiet until May 2002 when Citigroup announced plans to buy Golden State for $5.8 billion, but ultimately reduced the offer to $4.9 billion due to a stock drop. Citigroup's final offer was 0.821 shares of Citigroup common stock and $7.47 cash for every share of Golden State exchanged, which converted Perelman's 43 million shares of Golden State into $321,210,000 in cash plus 36,124,000 shares of Citigroup. All things considered, Perelman expected to make about $2 billion off the deal, but because he had quasi-sold many of his shares in the past, he probably gained substantially less than that.

=== Andrews Group ===
Andrews Group, Inc. was formed from the corporate shell of the former Compact Video. Andrews Group purchased Marvel Entertainment Group, Inc. in 1989 and later its former parent company New World Entertainment, Inc.

In 1989, Andrews Group lost $14.8 million with a negative net worth of $10 million. At this time, MacAndrews & Forbes owned 57%.

In 1991, Marvel Entertainment Group, Inc. went public with 30% sold to the public.

Andrews Group bought:

- Fleer – September 1992
- Toy Biz, Inc. – 46% Stake – 1993
- SCI Television – 54% Stake – 1993
- Genesis Entertainment – 50% Stake – Part of New World Entertainment.

In May 1994, New World bought four more stations from the Great American Communications for $360 million and four more from Argyle Television Holdings for $717 million. The purchase of Genesis and New World set up one of the spokes for the major 1994 television industry realignment in the wake of Fox's acquisition of NFL rights. Rupert Murdoch bought complete control of New World Communications for $3 billion, giving Perelman a large profit from the sale.

=== Meridian Sports Holdings ===
Also in 1989, MacAndrews & Forbes acquired The Coleman Company, Inc., maker of stoves, lanterns, and camping and other recreational equipment, for $545 million. Perelman reduced the debt for this purchase by selling the heating and air-conditioning divisions. By the end of 1990 he had sold everything except Coleman's camping equipment and boat businesses, plus added power tool and recreational vehicle businesses. Between 1993 and late 1995 he bought seven more companies for Coleman. In December 1997, Perelman and Al Dunlap met in order to discuss a possible deal between Coleman and Sunbeam Products. Coleman's famous but narrow brand held less growth potential than originally thought and Ronald Perelman wanted out. Coincidentally, Al Dunlap was sitting on a financially insolvent company he wanted to dump. It took until March 2 for them to finally come to an agreement: Perelman sold his entire stake (82%) in Coleman to Al Dunlap in exchange for $1.5 billion in cash and $680 million of Sunbeam stock. They completed the deal on March 30, despite a sell-off triggering press release from March 19 that said Sunbeam would not meet sales expectations. On April 3, another press release took Sunbeam's stock from bad to worse: It would not only fall short of sales expectations for that quarter, but it would barely meet the sales expectations of two years ago. The stock went into a tail spin, falling from $54 a share to $24 a share in a matter of weeks and continued its downward spiral in the following weeks. Perelman bought control of Sunbeam in an effort to salvage the situation but it was for naught. The company had to file for bankruptcy within three years.

=== Morgan Stanley ===
On February 17, 2005, Perelman filed a lawsuit against Morgan Stanley. Two facts were at issue: Did Morgan Stanley know about the problems with Sunbeam and was Ronald Perelman misled? During the discovery phase, the judge became exasperated with what she perceived as deliberate stonewalling on the part of Morgan Stanley and ordered the jury to assume Morgan Stanley deliberately and knowingly defrauded Perelman. Hobbled, Morgan Stanley had no choice but to argue that Perelman was too savvy an investor to have fallen for their transparent tricks. After a five-week trial, the jury deliberated for two days, found in favor of Perelman, and awarded him $1.45 billion. The damages stung particularly because Morgan Stanley passed up Perelman's offer to settle the case for $20 million. Morgan Stanley maintained that the court case was improperly decided, citing the judge's decision to use Florida law over New York law and her decision to order the jury to consider Morgan Stanley guilty before the trial began. In 2007, the courts of appeal reversed the judgement. The judges ruled that Perelman had failed to provide evidence demonstrating that he incurred any actual damages as a result of Morgan Stanley's actions. Perelman appealed, but found himself shot down by the Florida Supreme Court who dismissed it in a 5–0 decision. Undeterred even after that setback, Perelman went back to the trial court and asked for the case to be reopened because the hiding of email evidence was "a classic example of fraud on the court". The trial court rejected his arguments, but as of January 2009, he is beseeching Florida's 4th Circuit to reopen the case.

=== SPAC ===
In 2007, Perelman filed the paperwork for a SPAC (Special Purpose Acquisition Company) called MAFS Acquisition through his holding company MacAndrews & Forbes Holdings. A SPAC is a company founded solely for the purpose of buying out another company, but without any preselected target company. In Perelman's case, the company was selling 50 million units for $10 each. The IPO was being underwritten by Citigroup, but on December 12, 2008, a year after filing for an IPO, MAFS opted to withdraw their application for the "protection of investors".

== Subsidiaries ==
=== Current ===
As of 2019, MacAndrews & Forbes held interests in the following companies:

- Faneuil, Inc.
- M&F Worldwide (MFW)
  - Harland Clarke Holdings Corp.
    - Harland Clarke Corp. – formerly Clarke American Corp.
      - Checks in the Mail
    - Harland Financial Solutions
    - Valassis Communications
      - Clipper Magazine
      - Total Loyalty Solutions
    - Scantron Corporation
  - Flavors Holdings
  - Flavors Holdings
    - Mafco (descendant of the original MacAndrews & Forbes licorice business)
    - Merisant
- Revlon Group, Inc.
  - Revlon, Inc.
- Scientific Games Corporation
- SIGA Technologies Inc
- TransTech Pharma

=== Former ===
- AlliedBarton
  - AM General
- Andrews Group, Inc. (formerly Compact Video Inc.)
  - Marvel Entertainment Group, Inc.
  - Fleer
  - SkyBox
  - ToyBiz
  - New World Communications Group
    - New World Entertainment
    - SCI Television
    - Genesis Entertainment
    - Guthy-Renker Corporation
- First Gibraltar Bank
- Golden State Bancorp
- Consolidated Cigar Holdings Inc.
- Deluxe Entertainment Services Group Inc.
- Technicolor, Inc.
- Meridian Sports Holdings
  - Coleman Company, Inc.
  - Boston Whaler Inc.
  - MasterCraft
  - Skeeter Boats
  - O'Brien International Water Sports Equip
  - Soniform, Inc. Scuba Diving Equipment Mfg.
- Mafco Holdings, Inc.
  - Consolidated Cigar Holdings Inc. (2nd Time)
- Mafco Consolidated Group
  - Abex
- RetailMeNot

== See also ==
- Revlon, Inc. v. MacAndrews & Forbes Holdings, Inc.
- Top 100 US Federal Contractors
