= Gibraltar Savings Association =

Gibraltar Savings Association was a Houston, Texas based savings and loan. Its failure in 1988 and resolution was one of the most expensive in the savings and loan crisis at an estimated cost of $2.875 billion.

== Background ==
The thrift was founded as Gibraltar Savings and Building Association in 1921. It was formerly owned by Imperial Corporation of America in San Diego, but was spun off to shareholders in 1981. In 1984, Gibraltar Savings was acquired by First Texas Financial Corporation. FTFC, which had acquired First Texas Savings Association in Dallas in 1982, was controlled by nursing home developer J. Livingston Kosberg. An investor in FTFC was lawyer and political power broker Robert S. Strauss, who owned 10% of the stock. His son, real estate developer Richard Strauss, joined the board and was active in running the thrift.

== Failure ==
Gibraltar Savings failed in December 1988, at which time it was the largest thrift in Texas. Under the Federal Home Loan Bank Board and Federal Savings and Loan Insurance Corporation's Southwest Plan, five failed Texas thrifts with total assets of $12.2 billion were combined. The five thrifts were Gibraltar Savings Association (with $6.3 billion in assets), First Texas Savings Association in Dallas ($3.2 billion), Home Savings and Loan Association in Houston ($568 million), Killeen Savings and Loan Association in Killeen ($256 million), and Montfort Federal Savings and Loan Association in Dallas ($1.8 billion). (Montfort was formerly Vernon Savings and Loan.)

== Sale ==
In a controversial deal, the thrifts were sold in December 1988 to MacAndrews & Forbes Holdings Inc., (owned by Ronald Perelman) and Gerald J. Ford for $315 million, with the government spending $5.1 billion as their side of the transaction. As part of the sale, the investment group gained about $1 billion in tax benefits. The transaction was one of several sales of failed Texas thrifts that took place in the last days of 1988, as the special tax breaks were due to expire on January 1, 1989. The estimated resolution cost by the federal government for Gibraltar Savings Association was $2.875 billion, and $2.545 billion for the affiliated First Texas Savings Association, or a total combined cost of $5.42 billion.

== Revival and eventual sale ==
The thrift was reopened as First Texas Bank F.S.B., but then renamed First Gibraltar Bank, F.S.B. in 1989. BankAmerica Corp. acquired 130 branches of the thrift in 1993. Four branches were retained and renamed First Madison Federal Savings Bank, which then purchased First Nationwide Bank in 1994, California Federal Bank in 1997 and Glendale Federal Bank in 1998. In 2002 the thrift, by then renamed CalFed Bank, was purchased by Citigroup.
