= Bruce Slovin =

American business executive and archivist (1935–2025)

- Born: Bruce Elliott Slovin; December 10, 1935; New York City, U.S.
- Died: August 10, 2025 (aged 89); Poughkeepsie, New York, U.S.
- Education: Cornell University, (1957, BEcon), Harvard Law School (1960, JD), Columbia Business School (1961, MBA)
- Occupations: Lawyer; business executive; archivist; philanthropist
- Years active: 1961–2012
- Spouse: Rochelle Shaw (divorced) Francesca Cernia Slovin (m. 1985; died 2017)
- Children: 3

Bruce Elliott Slovin (December 10, 1935 – August 10, 2025) was an American lawyer, business executive, archivist and philanthropist.

== Early life and education ==
Slovin was born in Brooklyn on December 10, 1935, to a Russian and Polish Jewish family. He was one of the three children of Samuel Slovin, who owned an apparel manufacturing business, and Arnie Slovin (née Sebolsky; c. 1909–1997), who was a bookkeeper there. After World War II, the Slovins moved to Mount Vernon, Westchester County.

Slovin graduated from Cornell University in 1957 with a bachelor’s degree in economics. At Cornell, he was a member of Zeta Beta Tau. He earned a juris doctor in corporate law and taxation from Harvard Law School in 1960. He also attended Columbia Business School, from 1959 until 1961.

== Career ==
Slovin spent a few years practicing real estate law, before he was hired as an executive at Kane-Miller Corporation in 1965, a food distribution company where he assisted with acquisitions. In 1974, he left Kane-Miller to work at Hanson Industries, a conglomerate based in the United Kingdom, where he also focused on acquisitions. In 1980, Slovin was hired as vice chairman of MacAndrews & Forbes; he also an became an executive of the companies it acquired, including Revlon and Pantry Pride. Slovin later became president of MacAndrews & Forbes, serving until his retirement from the position in 2000. He later served as chair and president of 1 Eleven Associates, a private investment and real estate holding firm.

Slovin's other executive positions include directorships at The Coleman Company, the Andrews Group, Cantel Industries, Power Control Technologies and SIGA Technologies.

== Personal life and death ==
Slovin married Rochelle Shaw, with whom he had two sons. They eventually divorced. He later married Francesca Cernia Slovin (1952–2017) in 1985, with whom he had a daughter.

Slovin lived mainly in Manhattan and owned a weekend home in Rhinebeck, New York. He died from an aortic dissection at a hospital in Poughkeepsie, Dutchess County, on August 10, 2025, at the age of 89.

== Philanthropic efforts ==
=== YIVO ===
Slovin was named chairman of the board of YIVO in 1985 and served until 2012, after which he became chairman emeritus. During the first 15 years as YIVO chairman, he brought together 5 Jewish organizations under roof, raised around $100 million to build and maintain a new center for the institute and secured $30 million in tax-exempt bonds to support the construction of the center.

In 2018, Slovin established the YIVO Bruce and Francesca Cernia Slovin Online Museum, an online museum also available in Lithuanian teaching Jewish history of Eastern Europe to students all around the world. At YIVO, he was also involved in the creation of the Encyclopedia of Jews in Eastern Europe.

=== Center for Jewish History ===
Slovin brought together 5 Jewish institutions in the U.S. –namely YIVO, the American Jewish Historical Society, the American Sephardi Federation, the Leo Baeck Institute and the Yeshiva University Museum– under the name Center for Jewish History. He served as chairman of the organization from its opening in October 2000 until stepping down in May 2011. Under his tenure as CJH chairman, the organization had merger talks with New York University and Slovin started a fundraising campaign in 2011 to pay off the center’s $30 million debt, the fundraiser reached its goal in 15 months.

=== Trusteeships and memberships ===
Slovin was a trustee of the Beth Israel Medical Center, the Park East Synagogue, the Educational Alliance and the Morris Jumel Mansion. He was a member of the board of directors of the American Jewish Historical Society, the Circle in the Square Theatre from 1991 until 1996 and the American Sephardi Federation. In 2001 and 2002, Slovin was a member of the Human Rights Watch Council New York Committee.

=== The Slovin Foundation ===
Slovin founded The Slovin Foundation in 1988, through which he provided financial assistance to organizations including the American Sephardi Federation, the Museum of Jewish Heritage, the Museum at Eldridge Street, Cornell University, New York University, the Jewish Theological Seminary, the Park East Synagogue, the Environmental Defense Fund, Food for the Poor, the American Near East Refugee Aid, the USC Shoah Foundation, the Claims Conference, the International Conservation Caucus Foundation, the Fisher Center at Bard, the New York Public Library, the Historic Districts Council, The Forward, the Smithsonian Institution and the Council on Foreign Relations, among others.

=== Legacy ===
Cornell University Department of History has an assistant professorship title named after Slovin, currently held by Mayer Juni since 2022.

== Political positions ==
Slovin donated to Rudy Giuliani during his campaign in the 1997 mayoral election. During the 2001 mayoral election, he declared that he was "a big fan of all four Democrats [running in the race]":

"I met each one of them and [I] like them all. They each have their [own] strengths and their own weaknesses – and they have a tough act to follow."

he said.

== Recognition ==
Slovin became the first recipient of The Jewish Cultural Legacy Award in December 2017, which was later named in his honor for future recipients.
