= Glendale Federal =

Savings and loan association in California

Glendale Federal Savings and Loan Association, later Glendale Federal Bank, was one of the nation's largest federally chartered savings and loan association during the 1980s. It was long based in Los Angeles suburb Glendale, California, at 401 Brand Boulevard. The Glendale Federal brand was retired in 1998 when Glendale Federal was merged into California Federal Bank via a reverse merger engineered by Ronald Perelman and Gerald J. Ford, the owners of California Federal via their privately owned First Nationwide Holding Inc.

== History ==
The institution was founded 1934 as the First Federal Savings and Loan of Glendale.

In 1982, the S&L promoted itself simply as "Glendale Federal", dropping the "Savings and Loan Association" from its advertising and self-referencing.

In 1983, the S&L changed from a mutual organization to a federal stock form of organization.

Among the many other S&Ls that Glendale Federal acquired were:

- La Jolla Federal S&L, 1981
- First Federal Savings and Loan of Broward County, Florida, 1981
- Alameda Federal Savings and Loan Association, 1981

In 1988, it faced a federal probe on pay practices.

By the early 1990s, Glendale Federal had started advertising as Glendale Federal Bank, although it continued operating as a savings and loan.

In 1997, Glendale Federal Bank formed a holding company called Golden State Bancorp to allow it acquire other businesses.

=== Reverse merger with California Federal ===
In a very complex business procedure known as a reverse takeover or reverse merger, businessmen Ronald Perelman and Gerald J. Ford engineered the takeover of Glendale Federal Bank and Golden State Bancorp in 1998 by having public-owned Golden State Bancorp purchase Perelman and Ford's privately owned First Nationwide Holding Inc. for $2.5-billion in stock which gave First Nationwide Holding's board of directors control of the new merged holding company, the new holding company retained Golden State Bancorp name and history, but the new savings bank retained the California Federal Bank's name and brand. Most of the managers for the combined company came from First Nationwide Holding along with First Nationwide's San Francisco headquarters building being retained. The saving bank merger resulted in the third largest thrift in the nation with $51 billion in assets and have more than 400 branches in eight states with 280 of those branches in California. The merger also resulted in the elimination of 60 California Federal and Glendale Federal branches and 1,100 out of the 8,400 jobs.

== Architecture ==
The Glendale Federal building at 9454 Wilshire Boulevard in Beverly Hills is a landmark, as is the 1959 Glendale headquarters, designed by Wenceslao Sarmiento.

In 1991, Universal Animation Studios opened its offices in the building at 121 Lexington Drive, which is part of the Glendale Federal headquarters, while the main building remained vacant. The studio operated here until 2006, when it moved its offices into Universal City, and the building was bought by Hollywood Production Center. In early 2009, Hollywood Production Center also purchased the main building.
