= Insignia (disambiguation) =

An insignia is a sign or mark distinguishing a group, grade, rank, or function.

Insignia may also refer to:

- Insignia trilogy, a series of young-adult science fiction novels by S.J. Kincaid
- MS Insignia, the lead ship of the R class of cruise ships built for Renaissance cruises
- Insignia Systems, a publicly traded U.S. corporation
- Opel Insignia, a large family car model
- Insignia, a brand of electronic equipment produced by Best Buy
- Insignia Financial Group, a real estate company in South Carolina
- Insignia (Xbox), a server recreating Xbox Live for the original Xbox
