= Ron Perleman =

Ron Perleman is a misspelling of:

- Ron Perlman (born 1950), American actor
- Ron Perelman (born 1943), American banker, businessman, investor, and philanthropist
