= BugMeNot =

Defunct Internet service

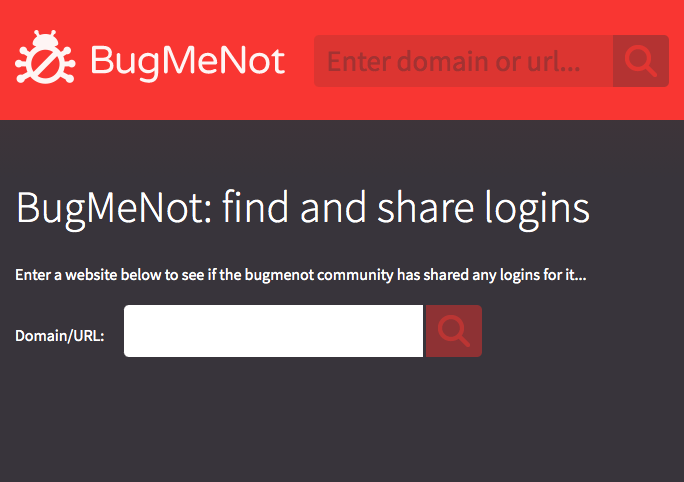
- The homepage of the website in February 2021
- Website type: Online database
- Available in: English
- Dissolved: November 2026
- Creator: Guy King
- Website: bugmenot.com
- Registration: None
- Launched: August 2003
- Current status: Defunct

BugMeNot was an Internet service that provided usernames and passwords allowing Internet users to bypass mandatory free registration on websites. It was started in August 2003 by an anonymous person, later revealed to be Guy King, and allowed Internet users to access websites that had registration walls (for instance, that of The New York Times) with the requirement of compulsory registration. This came in response to the increasing number of websites that requested such registration, which many Internet users found to be an annoyance and a potential source of email spam.

== Use of the service ==
BugMeNot allowed users of their service to add new accounts for sites with free registration. It also encouraged users to use disposable email address services to create such accounts. However, it did not allow them to add accounts for paid websites, as this could potentially lead to credit card fraud. BugMeNot also claimed to remove accounts for any website, requesting that they did not provide accounts for non-registered users.

To help make access to their service easier, BugMeNot hosted a bookmarklet that could be used with any browser to automatically find a usable account from their service. They also hosted extensions for the web browsers Mozilla Firefox (but not on Firefox Quantum), Internet Explorer, and Google Chrome (the extensions were created by Eric Hamiter with Dmytri Kleiner and Dean Wilson, respectively). There were also implementations in the form of a BugMeNot Opera widget, or UserJS scripts along with buttons, which made it fully browser-integrated. An Android application was available, but that was unlisted from the Google Play Store.

=== Opting out ===
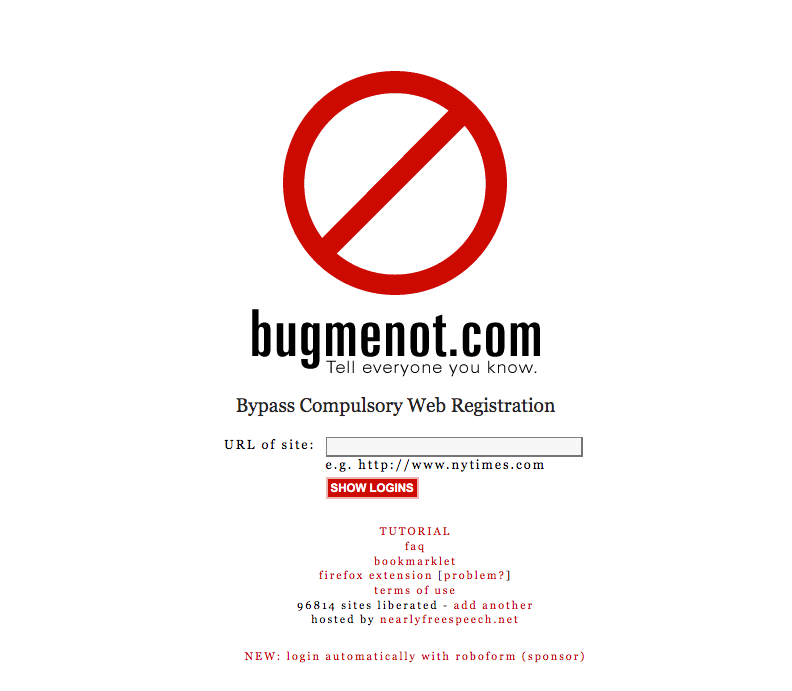
The original BugMeNot website

BugMeNot provided an option for site owners to block their site from the BugMeNot database, if they matched one or more of the following criteria:

- A community site where users register to change content, but not to view it, such as Wikipedia
- A pay-per-view site, such as many paid journals
- A fraud risk associated with the site due to accounts containing private financial information

These blocks could be bypassed by sharing logins under a similar domain name, where the logins were understood by users to be logins for the blocked domain name. For example, Wikipedia logins were in the database under wikipedia.com because wikipedia.org had been banned under the first criterion.

== History ==
=== 2004 temporary shutdown and return ===
Nearly a year after it was created, BugMeNot was shut down temporarily by its service provider (at that time), HostGator. The site's creator claimed BugMeNot's host was pressured by websites to shut them down, though Hostgator claimed that the BugMeNot site was repeatedly crashing their servers.

The BugMeNot domain was transferred briefly to another hosting company, dissidenthosting.com, but before the site was set up, it began to redirect visitors to web pages belonging to racist groups, without the knowledge or consent of the site's owner. BugMeNot moved again, to NearlyFreeSpeech.NET. BugMeNot's move to this provider, which also hosts a number of highly controversial sites, prompted BugMeNot's creator to say, "Personally, I don't care if I'm sharing a server with neo-Nazis. I might not agree with what they have to say, but the whole thing about freedom of speech is that people are free to speak."

Shortly after BugMeNot returned, reports surfaced that some news sites had begun to attempt to block accounts posted on BugMeNot, though the extent and effectiveness of such efforts, as well as compliance with BugMeNot's Terms of Use, are not known.

=== Closure ===
In November 2026, BugMeNot ceased operations. The service was replaced with a landing page displaying the message "BugMeNot has closed." alongside the text "Thanks to everyone who envisioned a better internet." Clicking the site's logo revealed an encoded message.

== See also ==
- RetailMeNot, a company created by the same person.
