= Raymond G. Perelman =

American businessman and philanthropist (1917–2019)

- Born: August 22, 1917; Philadelphia, Pennsylvania, U.S.
- Died: January 14, 2019 (aged 101); Philadelphia, Pennsylvania, U.S.
- Education: Wharton School of the University of Pennsylvania
- Occupations: Businessman, investor, philanthropist
- Employer: RGP Holdings
- Title: Founder, chair, and CEO of RGP Holdings
- Children: Ronald Perelman; Jeffrey E. Perelman

Raymond G. Perelman (August 22, 1917 – January 14, 2019) was an American businessman, investor, and philanthropist who served as the founder, chairman and CEO of RGP Holdings. He was the father of Ronald Perelman and Jeffrey E. Perelman. He was known for his philanthropy and charitable giving, as well as his close ties with the city of Philadelphia and the University of Pennsylvania.

== Early life ==
Raymond Perelman grew up in the Olney and Feltonville neighborhoods of Philadelphia.

== Education ==
Raymond Perelman studied business and finance at the Wharton School of the University of Pennsylvania. He graduated from Wharton in 1940, and began his career in investing and philanthropy.

== Career ==
His early career was spent working at his father's family business, American Paper Products Company. He remained there for 50 years. In 1960, Perelman bought the company Belmont Iron Works, "the largest steel fabricator in the Northeast, which provided structural steel for the construction industry."

Raymond Perelman, through RGP Holdings, owned significant interests in financial, manufacturing and mining companies. He was a trustee of the Raymond and Ruth Perelman Education Foundation.

Raymond Perelman was the chairman and CEO of Belmont Holdings Corporation from 1994 onward. He also served as president and CEO of Champion Parts, as well as the chairman of Grefco Minerals and additional companies.

According to the Chronicle of Philanthropy, Raymond and Ruth Perelman donated hundreds of millions to various organizations, with the University of Pennsylvania being the largest benefactor. In 2011 alone, they donated over $227 million, with $225 million going to the University of Pennsylvania.

== Personal ==
Raymond Perelman had been in legal disputes with his son, Jeffrey Perelman. He was Jewish, and died on January 14, 2019, at age 101.
