= Brian Medavoy =

American film producer

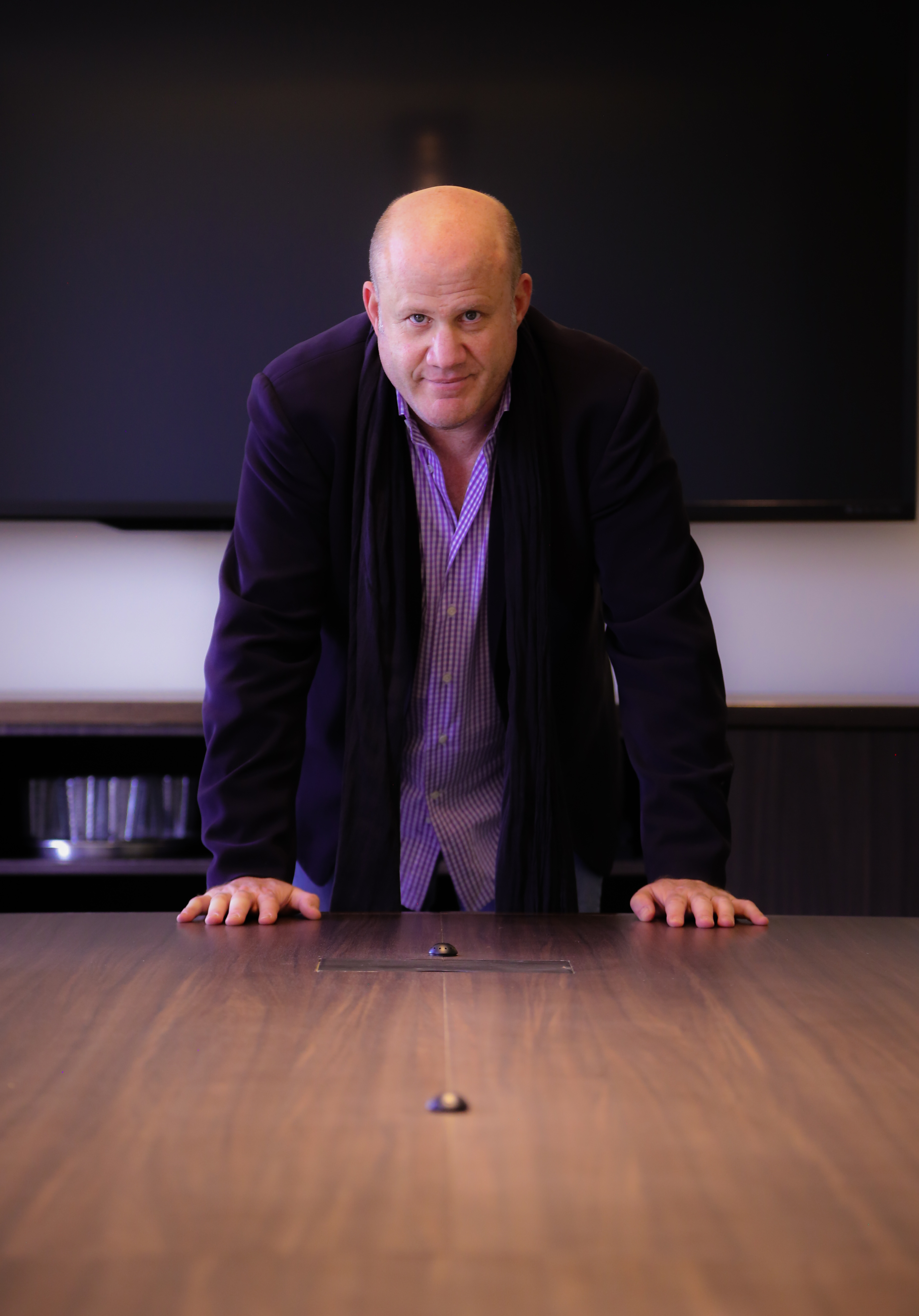
- Occupations: Talent manager, entrepreneur, film and television producer
- Years active: 1985–present
- Father: Mike Medavoy

Brian Medavoy is an American film and television producer, talent manager and entrepreneur. He is the son of film producer and executive, Mike Medavoy.

== Career ==
Medavoy began his career in 1985 in the mail room at the Creative Artists Agency. He then moved to ICM Partners' mail room and eventually became the assistant to talent agent Ed Limato.

In 1990, he co-founded More Medavoy Management with his partner Erwin More. Clients included Bill Bellamy, Jason Biggs, Bon Jovi, Mariah Carey, Morris Chestnut, Jenna Elfman, Jimmy Fallon, Melissa Gilbert, Mariska Hargitay, Lucy Lawless, Howie Long, Marlee Matlin, Jenny McCarthy, Patrick Swayze, Cicely Tyson, Maria Bello, Kristen Bell, Jason Bateman, Josh Brolin, Ryan Reynolds, Tobey Maguire, and Peter Berg.

From 1994 until 2002, Brian Medavoy received producer credits on television movies and series including Sweet Justice, The Single Guy, Since You've Been Gone, Getting Personal, Ringmaster, American High, Dharma & Greg and Just Shoot Me!. In 1999, More Medavoy Management merged with Susan Bymell and Evelyn O'Neill becoming the Talent Entertainment Group. It was while working at Talent Entertainment Group that Brian Medavoy received an Emmy for his work on American High.

Medavoy and Erwin More joined forces again in 2014 and clients included Paula Patton, Neal McDonough, Bella Heathcote, Kristoffer Polaha, Reno Wilson, Michael Beach, Ben Koldyke and Eric Balfour.

== Filmography ==
Year(s)	Film	Notes
1994-1995	Sweet Justice	Co-Producer
1995-1997	The Single Guy	Co-Producer
1998	Getting Personal	Executive Producer
2001	American High	Executive Producer
1997-2002	Dharma & Greg	Executive Producer
1999-2002	Just Shoot Me!	Co-Executive Producer
