= Irena Medavoy =

American actress

- Born: Irena Gerasimenko; September 19, 1958 (age 68); Los Angeles, California, U.S.
- Other name: Irena Ferris
- Occupations: Activist, philanthropist, entrepreneur, actress, model
- Years active: 1964–present
- Spouses: Joseph Brock Ward (m. 19??; div. 19??); Arthur Sarkissian (m. 1981; div. 1984) Harris Katleman (m. 1984; div. 1985) Mike Medavoy (m. 1995)
- Children: 1 (with Medavoy)

Irena Medavoy, a.k.a. Irena Ferris (born Irena Gerasimenko on September 19, 1958), is an American actress, philanthropist, activist, and entrepreneur.

== Early life ==
Fluent in Russian and English, Medavoy was born to Russian Orthodox immigrant parents, Margaret and Vladimir Gerasimenko. Both her parents had been in Nazi concentration camps during World War II after which they fled to Morocco and then immigrated to the United States in 1957. While she was still in high school she worked for Tichi Wilkerson Miles, the first female editor of The Hollywood Reporter

== Career ==
As Irena Gerasimenko, she worked as a model for Sports Illustrated. Along with her roommate Bernadette Leonard (a fellow Sports Illustrated model) and Jennifer Flavin (a model and wife of Sylvester Stallone), she serves as Vice Chairman and collaborated to create a charity, C.O.A.C.H. for Kids and their Families which is a community outreach assistance for children's health.

She started acting with two small roles in the television movies, Once Upon a Spy and Cocaine and Blue Eyes. She had a recurring role on Dallas as a girlfriend of Bobby Ewing. She had a series regular role on the television series Cover Up.

She played a Soviet bureaucrat on Night Court guest starring in an Emmy nominated 1988 episode entitled "Russkie Business".

In 1991, Medavoy founded Phoenix Enterprises with Pirie Jones and together with American Telecast produced product marketing television programs including the hair care series 'Beverly Hills Beauty'. Her direct marketing company sold on QVC where Medavoy invented, manufactured and sold beauty, health, fitness and self-help products for women. Her electronic response firm called High Heels and Loafers with partner Pirie Jones created a company at King World to direct response sales.

She is a contributing writer for the Huffington Post on topics including President Barack Obama (for whom she held an election fundraising campaign) Oprah Winfrey, female body images in the media which she regards as unrealistic and harmful, and her experiences with botox.

== Awards and recognition ==
- In 2008 Sean Penn presented the Medavoy family with the Danny Kaye Humanitarian award from UNICEF. Penn spoke at Mike Medavoy's Hollywood Walk of Fame Star unveiling.
- The Women's Image Network Awards (2015) Woman of the Year Honoree.

== Personal life ==
In 1984, she married Harris L. Katleman, president and CEO of 20th Century Fox Television in a Jewish ceremony in Beverly Hills, California. In 1995, she married film producer Mike Medavoy. They have a son, Nicholas.

She is a founding board member of Truth In Advertising Alliance, which works to fight anorexia and bulimia and pass legislation to outlaw excessive photo shopping models.

Medavoy is the co-founder of Team Safe-T which teaches disaster preparedness in California public schools.

She served on the Advisory Board of the charity A Sense of Home, ASOH youtube.com; accessed May 12, 2017. which offers safety and community to children who age out of the foster care system at age eighteen. Founded by Georgie Smith, ASOH founder Smith said of Medavoy and her charity, "ASOH began as a random act of kindness when I responded to a cry for a help from a young man who had aged out of foster care, and who had secured an apartment but had no means to obtain a solitary item that might make it feel like home. {Smith's] partner Melissa Goddard and [Smith] couldn’t help but notice the great void in our community. All foster youth who age out of the system, having never been adopted, are all alone in the world, without family members to offer them hand me downs let alone the helping hand it requires to source, collect, install and make a space feel like home: Home is the foundation we all need to thrive. Each year, 35,000 young people age out in the US. Statistics predict they are the least likely to succeed. Fifty percent of foster children will experience homelessness.

Upon learning this information, Irena Medavoy organized a collection of household items with associates and encouraged the establishment of a nonprofit organization based on the initial initiative. She regularly connects individuals with sources of financial assistance, mentorship, and youth employment opportunities.
