= NearlyFreeSpeech =

Web hosting provider and domain name registrar

- Type: Private company
- Industry: Web hosting service, Cloud computing service, Cloud storage service, Domain name registrar
- Founded: 2002; 24 years ago U.S.
- Area served: Worldwide
- Products: Web and cloud services
- Website: www.nearlyfreespeech.net

NearlyFreeSpeech is a privately funded, US-based, low-cost web hosting provider and domain name registrar that began in 2002. It was started in response to concerns about the entry of large companies into Internet publishing and to promote freedom of speech.

== History ==
In September 2006, Jeffrey D. Wheelhouse registered the NearlyFreeSpeech trademark.

=== Endorsements ===
By 2008, Michael Hemmingson of San Diego Reader wrote that the Electronic Frontier Foundation suggested using services such as NearlyFreeSpeech.net and Tor software to avoid being fired for blogging. In 2009, Shawn Powers of Linux Journal reviewed NearlyFreeSpeech and recommended them over GoDaddy even after having some technical issues. In 2010, Jason Fitzpatrick of LifeHacker.com listed NearlyFreeSpeech as first of "Five Best Personal Web Hosts" and said they were unusual because of their incremental billing based on usage. In a similar 2012 "top five" list by Alan Henry of LifeHacker.com, NearlyFreeSpeech was given "honorable mention" and he said they offer exceptional hosting plans for as low as $0.25, and promise to only make you pay for what you use.

In 2010, in "Twitter Application Development For Dummies", Dusty Reagan recommended NearlyFreeSpeech for learning PHP development. In 2010, Cody Fink of MacStories.net, describing how to install Fever in 10 minutes, called NearlyFreeSpeech, "an amazing hosting solution that's relatively cheap, especially for light use." In 2012, in "Handbook of Research on Didactic Strategies and Technologies for Education" NearlyFreeSpeech was cited as a "pay-as-you-go" service, which could reduce costs significantly. In 2013, NearlyFreeSpeech was used for a low-cost ($7 USD) promotion involving the posting of indie Zelda-like game Anodyne on The Pirate Bay.

=== Controversies ===
==== BugMeNot controversy ====
In 2004, Matt Hines of CNET reported that NearlyFreeSpeech supported BugMeNot against takedown attempts. Kevin Newcomb of ClickZ.com wrote that Texas-based NearlyFreeSpeech.net spokesman Jeff Wheelhouse stated, "NearlyFreeSpeech.NET supports and defends the free expression rights of www.bugmenot.com and all our members to the very limit of its terms of service."

BugMeNot's move to NearlyFreeSpeech, which also hosts a number of highly controversial sites, prompted BugMeNot's creator to say, "Personally, I don't care if I'm sharing a server with neo-Nazis. I might not agree with what they have to say, but the whole thing about freedom of speech is that people are free to speak."

==== Badger Killers website controversy ====
In 2012, Kelly Fiveash of The Register reported that US-based hosting firm NearlyFreeSpeech resisted UK government attempts to take down the Badger-Killers website, which published the personal details of individuals deemed to be badger-cull supporters, including politicians, farmers, and professors.

==== Alt-right and other controversies ====
In 2017, Ali Breland of The Hill described how NearlyFreeSpeech's commitment was tested in the 2012 badger-culling website case. She also quoted the CEO of Gab, an alt-right alternative to Twitter, who said that NearlyFreeSpeech might be a "safe haven" for his website after its web host gave the company five days to transfer its domain. According to the 2017 book Media Law, Ethics, and Policy in the Digital Age, NearlyFreeSpeech's policy of requiring a court order to shut down websites made it the hosting choice for Jonathan Bishop's Crocels News after other providers dropped the site during a defamation dispute. In the 2019 book Technical Blogging: Amplify Your Influence, Antonio Cangiano "wholeheartedly" recommended NearlyFreeSpeech as a registrar and web host for controversial content.

In January 2021, NearlyFreeSpeech published a statement in response to a surge in business and communications from "racists." The statement was intended to clarify the company's position on "free speech," its refusal to host illegal content, its careful cooperation with law enforcement, and its opposition to racism, hatred, and bigotry.
