= Patricia Duff =

American political activist (born 1954)

- Born: Patricia Michelle Orr; April 12, 1954 (age 72); Los Angeles, California, U.S.
- Education: Georgetown University (BSFS)
- Spouses: Thomas Zabrodsky (m. 19??; div. 19??); Daniel Duff (m. 1980; div. 1985) Mike Medavoy (m. 1986; div. 1994) Ronald Perelman (m. 1995; div. 1996)
- Children: 1

Patricia Duff (born Patricia Michelle Orr; April 12, 1954) is an American political activist, and a fundraiser for political and philanthropic causes. She has participated in campaigns involving politicians and business people.

== Early life and education ==
Duff was born in Southern California and was raised in Bonn, Germany and Brussels, Belgium, graduating from the International School of Brussels.

Duff received a BSFS degree in international economics at the Edmund A. Walsh School of Foreign Service at Georgetown University.

== Career ==
Duff first worked on the House Select Committee on Assassinations as special assistant to the chief counsel, senior researcher, and public information officer.

Duff then worked with former presidential speech writer John McLaughlin to produce his political talk radio show. She left to work for the re-election campaign of President Jimmy Carter at the Democratic National Committee and with presidential pollster Pat Caddell.

Following her work on that campaign, she was made a vice president of Caddell's polling firm and worked on political statewide campaigns and corporate marketing campaigns until she was hired by the Squier-Eskew consulting firm.

After working on several senate and gubernatorial campaigns, Duff moved in 1984 to Los Angeles to work with the Gary Hart presidential campaign. Duff was an activist in Democratic Party politics and in a number of causes.

In the late 1980s, Duff started an entertainment industry-related non-partisan political organization called Show Coalition, which became an element in the nexus between Washington politics and Hollywood and the precursor to The Common Good.

Duff played a role in fundraising for Bill Clinton's 1996 re-election campaign. She organised high-profile events, including a $1,000-a-plate dinner at the Sheraton New York, which became a major display of her influence within Democratic circles. Duff personally mobilised donors, worked phones to secure contributions, and used her East Side townhouse to host receptions for key figures, including Vice President Al Gore and Hillary Clinton.

Duff founded a non-profit, non-partisan organization, The Common Good, in New York in 2007. The organization hosts events to encourage greater citizen participation in civic life and the political process.

== Political affiliations ==
A lifelong Democrat, Duff has also supported Republicans, notably Richard Riordan for mayor of Los Angeles and Michael Bloomberg for mayor of New York.

== Personal life ==
Duff has been married four times, first to high school sweetheart Thomas Zabrodsky in the late 1970s. She was then married to Washington, D.C. attorney Daniel Duff from 1980 to 1985. She then married Orion Pictures and later TriStar Pictures CEO Mike Medavoy from 1986 to 1994, after converting to Judaism. She was married to businessman Ronald Perelman from 1995 to 1996, with whom she had a daughter, Caleigh, in December 1994.
