= News America Marketing =

US marketing business owned by News Corp

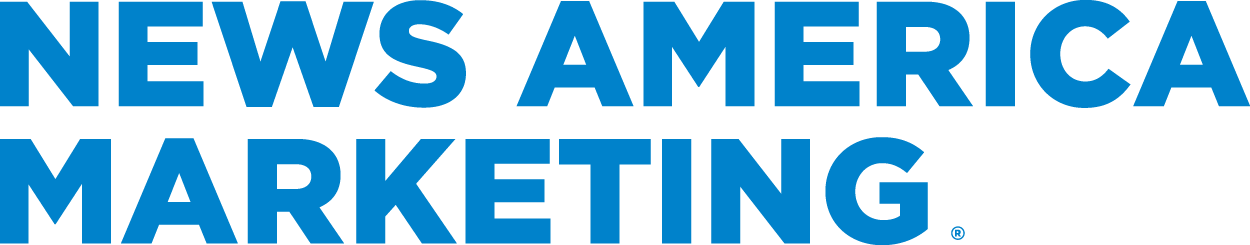
- Type: subsidiary of News Corp
- Industry: Marketing
- Founded: New York, United States (1988)
- Headquarters: 1185 Avenue of the Americas; New York City, NY 10036, U.S.
- Area served: United States; Canada
- Products: Home delivered, in-store and online consumer marketing services
- Number of employees: 900 Full Time, 4,000 Part Time
- Parent: News Corp
- Website: NewsAmerica.com

News America Marketing, often referred to as just News America, was a marketing business previously owned by News Corp. It publishes SmartSource Magazine, a weekly consumer-branded newspaper insert offering advertising and coupon promotions, delivered in over 1,600 newspapers in the U.S. and is one of three companies in the United States (the other two are Valassis Communications and Insignia Systems) that control almost all the in-store ads and grocery coupons in the United States.

One major division of the company is SmartSource iGroup, formed in 2000 from acquisitions and investments and runs the company's online couponing site, www.smartsource.com, in addition to other interactive consumer businesses like sampling and direct mail. The SmartSource brand began in 1998.

== History ==
The News America FSI was formed when News Corporation purchased the marketing divisions of two Free Standing Insert (FSI) business competitors: Quad/Marketing Inc. and Product Movers Inc., in 1988. In 1997, News America purchased Actmedia, an In-Store marketing and promotions company that operated out of Connecticut, and the company changed its name to News America Marketing.

== Products ==
News America Marketing has three categories of products: Home-Delivered network, In-Store network, and Online-Savings network.

The Home-Delivered network contains the free standing SmartSource Magazine, door hangers, direct mail promotions, and home-delivered samples.

The In-Store products include at-shelf messaging, coupon dispensers, cart advertisements, large format entrance ads, Shelfvision video, floor messaging, and in-store sampling.

The Online Savings network includes SmartSource.com. In 2011, SmartSource began printing QR codes on its online printable coupons in order to prevent coupon fraud. The company released a free couponing application for iPad titled SmartSource Xpress in March 2012. SmartSource Xpress for iPhone was released in 2013.

On July 24, 2015, News America Marketing purchased the Canadian company Checkout 51 for an undisclosed price. Checkout 51 provides consumers with a digital means of performing coupon redemptions through smart phone enabled receipt scanning technology.

== News Marketing Canada ==
News Marketing Canada was created in 1995 through the merger of two separate Canadian FSI companies and today publishes the coupon inserts, SmartSource Magazine and UtiliSource, the French-language version. Since News America Marketing's 1997 purchase of Act Media, News Marketing Canada has offered in-store advertising and promotional products as well. In September 2011, it launched SmartSource.ca, a coupon website for Canadian shoppers.

== Philanthropy ==
News America Marketing has published two Children's Miracle Network Hospitals-themed issues of their SmartSource coupon insert every year for more than 20 years, generating funds and media value for the organization. SmartSource Magazine has also featured an annual issue of an Easter Seals-themed insert. Over the course of 15 years, the Easter Seals-themed SmartSource Magazine has helped generate more than $3.3 million for Easter Seals. News America Marketing has also supported Volunteers of America's "Toys for the Holidays" program.

Since 2009, News America Marketing has sponsored an all-expense-paid trip to the Super Bowl each year for two Marines and a guest.

Each November since 2011, News America Marketing has published a special edition of SmartSource Magazine featuring Wounded Warrior Project's "Believe in Heroes" campaign. In addition, the organization has held fundraisers in its individual offices for the Wounded Warrior Project as well as Operation Gratitude.

== Operations ==
In the fiscal year ending June 2005, the company had 28% operating margins. Its annual revenues were $1.1 billion, an increase of 9% from the prior year. As of 2007, News America produced the majority of revenues for News Corporation's magazines and inserts division, and it controlled an estimated 50% to 60% of the insert market and as much as 90% of the in-store business.

== Legal cases ==
In 2005, Theme Promotions, a merchandising firm, won a $6.8 million jury verdict against News America. The California jury found News America guilty of violating civil antitrust and unfair-competition laws.

In 2006, the state of Minnesota accused News America of engaging in unfair trade practices. The company settled in 2008 by agreeing to pay costs and not to falsely disparage its competitors.

In March 2006, a News America Marketing coupon insert competitor, Valassis Communications, settled FTC charges that it had attempted to induce News America Marketing to collude on pricing by signing a consent decree that barred Valassis from engaging in, or attempting to engage in, future anticompetitive behavior. The FTC made no charges against News America Marketing in connection with its investigation. Shortly after the decree was signed, Valassis sued News America Marketing.

Between 2009 and 2011, the News Corporation paid out about $655 million to settle charges of corporate espionage and anticompetitive behavior by News America.

- In 2009, a federal case in New Jersey (Floorgraphics v. News America Marketing In-Store Services Inc, 04-cv-3500, U.S. District Court, District of New Jersey, Trenton) brought by a company called Floorgraphics went to trial, accusing News America of hacking into Floorgraphics's password-protected computers. Much of the lawsuit was based on the testimony of Robert Emmel, a former News America executive who claimed to be a whistle-blower. After a few days of testimony, the News Corporation settled with Floorgraphics for $29.5 million; several days after that, it bought Floorgraphics. On 20 July, US Senator Frank Lautenberg wrote a letter to the Department of Justice requesting that the ongoing FBI probe include the Floorgraphics hacking allegations. On July 21, 2011, it was reported that representatives of the United States Department of Justice and the FBI had begun investigation into the Floorgraphics allegations.
- In 2010, the News Corporation paid $500 million to settle a case brought against it by Valassis Communications, after that company had won a $300 million verdict in state court in Michigan. The lawsuit by Valassis was based on claims that News America had gained market share by forcing its packaged-goods customers to sign long-term insert contracts or risk huge price increases on their in-store advertising displays The settlement included News America entering into a 10-year shared mail distribution agreement with Valassis Direct Mail, a Valassis subsidiary.
- At the beginning of 2011, in a case in Minnesota brought by Insignia Systems, News America faced more than $600 million in fines. The News Corporation paid out $125 million to settle the allegations of anticompetitive behavior and violations of antitrust laws. This was the third time that the two companies had been involved in lawsuits. In August 2000, Insignia was sued by News America regarding exclusive promotional agreements with several major supermarket retailers, a suit that was settled confidentially in November 2002. In November 2003 Insignia was sued again, regarding Insignia's right to market in-store advertising and promotional services.

In late 2011, the District Court of Atlanta granted a permanent injunction prohibiting Robert Emmel, a former News America Marketing executive, from sharing News America Marketing's confidential information and found that Emmel was not a whistleblower and was therefore not entitled to whistleblower protection under the Dodd-Frank Act, as he had claimed. In the court's ruling, it stated that far from harassing, or acting in a retaliatory manner towards him, News America Marketing “actually assisted Emmel in obtaining new employment after it terminated him.”
