= Clipper Magazine =

Direct marketing company

Clipp
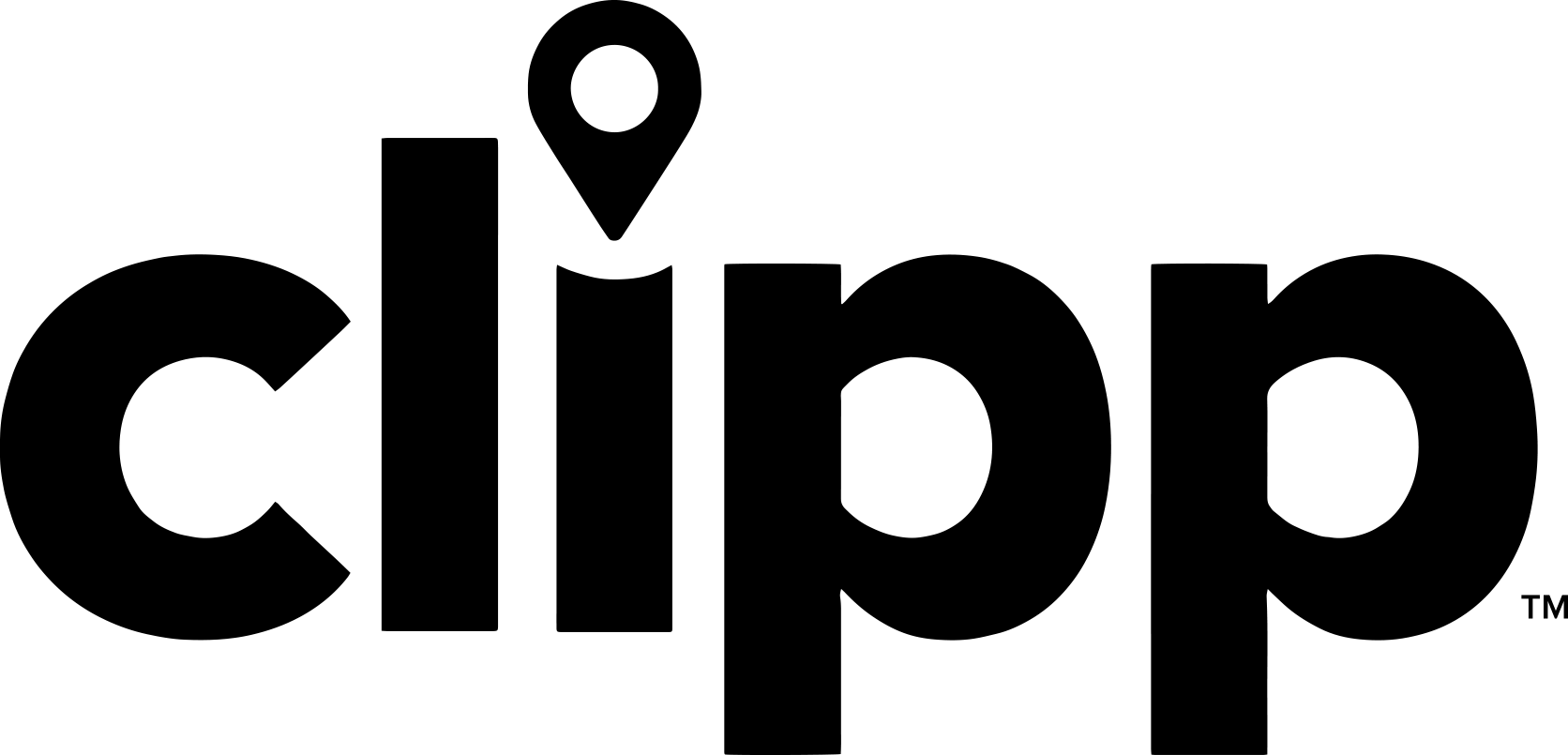
- Formerly: Clipper Magazine
- Company type: Subsidiary
- Industry: Direct marketing
- Founded: 1983
- Headquarters: St. Petersburg, Florida
- Products: Print coupons, digital coupons, advertising magazines, advertising postcards, data, CTV
- Owner: AmatoMartin
- Website: Clipp

Clipp (formerly Clipper Magazine) is a direct marketing company with 413 local editions and specialty publications in 22 states each mailing 6 to 12 times annually to more than 21 million homes. In addition to the Clipp magazine, Clipp publishes Prestigious Living and hosts coupons and purchased deals on clipp.com.

== History ==
The company started in 1983 as a student business at Franklin & Marshall College, in Lancaster, Pennsylvania, by Steve Zuckerman, Ian Ruzow and Bob Zuckerman.

In November 2015, Clipp was purchased for an undisclosed amount by Valassis Communications, a Michigan-based direct-mail company. Valassis acquired Clipp in an effort to accelerate its expansion into local business markets.

In April 2022, Clipp was acquired by AmatoMartin, a privately held investment company that also owns Valpak.

== Products ==
=== Coupon magazines ===
Clipp prints, packages and ships Clipp magazine advertising coupons and deals for local businesses and national brands across the United States. The cover, back and inside pages, and inserts consist entirely of advertisements with coupons for dining, health and beauty, entertainment, automotive, home services, and more.

Clipp also prints, packages and ships Prestigious Living magazine, a premier lifestyle magazine for upscale home services. The cover, back and inside pages, and inserts consist entirely of advertisements with coupons for home renovations, luxury retail goods, fine dining experiences, automotive sales, interior design, and more.

=== Advertising postcards ===
Clipp Local Data Postcards accompany Clipp magazine and Prestigious Living magazine and are delivered simultaneously to the same addresses. Clipp also offers traditional saturation and targeted postcards delivered separately from the magazines to selected ZIP codes and addresses.

=== Customer data ===
Clipp’s data and analytics platform incorporates thousands of data points across billions of records (aggregated public, survey, behavioral, transactional, and proprietary data) for brands to identify and advertise to specific audience segments.

Marketers can also use its self-service mailing list platform to create their own mailing lists prioritized by rankings, deliverability and postal rates.

=== Digital deals ===
Clipp’s online platform is clipp.com (formerly LocalFlavor.com). Here consumers can purchase a paid value and receive a discount certificate worth a higher promotional value. For example, a customer may pay $20 and receive a certificate valued at $40.
