= Insignia Systems =

American advertising company

Insignia Systems, Inc.
- Type: Public
- Traded as: Nasdaq: ISIG
- Industry: Media services
- Founded: 1990; 36 years ago, in Minnesota, United States
- Founder: GL Hoffman, David Eiss
- Headquarters: 8799 Brooklyn Blvd, Minneapolis, MN 55445, U.S.
- Area served: United States
- Key people: Kristine Glancy (CEO), Jeff Jagerson (CFO),
- Products: In-store consumer marketing services
- Website: insignisystems.com

Insignia Systems, Inc., often referred to as just Insignia, is a publicly traded U.S. Corporation that manufactures point of sale in-store signs and promotional advertising media for consumer packaged goods companies and retailers. Insignia is one of three companies in the United States (the other two are Valassis Communications and News America Marketing) that control almost all the in-store ads and grocery coupons in the United States.

The company is broken into two parts, the first of which maintains a relationship with retailers for placing signs in stores. The second part markets and provides signs to Fast-moving consumer goods, better known as consumer packaged goods companies (or simply CPG companies), which are then placed into the partnering retail locations.

== History ==
Insignia Systems, Inc. was founded on January 2, 1990 by G.L. Hoffman and David Eiss. The company began operations by selling Impulse sign machines that printed in-Store signs and labels. In 1991, Insignia Systems became a publicly traded company, trading on the NASDAQ as ISIG, moving to the National Market in 2002. In 1993 Stylus software was introduced as precursor to the future Insignia POPS line and the original Impulse machine was replaced with the SignRight machine in 1996. Soon after, in 1998, the Insignia POPS innovative sign program became the company's featured product.

1998 was a critical year for Insignia as sales were down and new business was a necessity. In May of that same year the Insignia POPS sign was introduced and, on February 24, 1998, Scott Drill was named CEO of the company. With Drill providing additional direction and the POPS business established, the company and the POPS program grew quickly, reaching 1 million signs in 2001 and 40 million signs in 2011. Through 2006 and 2007, Insignia confirmed a 10-year partnership with Valassis Communications, filling the in-store void for Valassis.

In 2011, the Company reached a settlement of a lawsuit between Insignia Systems and News America Marketing, owned by Rupert Murdoch's News Corporation. The basis of the lawsuit was the accusation of News America Marketing for engaging in various antitrust practices. New America Marketing settled the lawsuit for $125 million, and the two companies entered into a business agreement, making Insignia the sole third party provider of in-store signs with price.

== Insignia POPS Program ==
The Insignia POPS Program is the consumer-facing brand of Insignia. Insignia POPS is a sign placed at the shelf, primarily in grocery stores, that contains brand messaging, brand graphics and price. According to the company, the Insignia POPS Program has access to more than 23,000 stores across the United States through their own retailer network and other business relationships. Insignia utilizes a laser die cutter to create each sign individually which allows for unique patterns, shapes and granularity of the signs produced. On January 13, 2014, Insignia announced that the company had produced its 50 millionth Insignia POPS sign with the laser die cutter.

== The Like Machine ==
The Like Machine, developed by TLM Holdings, LLC, is a consumer approval device designed to bring the benefits of online recommendations to brick and mortar stores. This device is mounted directly to store shelves near the featured product. It consists of a "Like" button for consumers to press when in favor of a product. The like button is accompanied by a readout that displays the number of likes a particular product has received in a given time period. The machine is designed to bring word of mouth directly to the point of purchase. It was released to limited retailers in November 2014 for testing, and is expected to be released on a larger scale in the middle of 2015.

== Legal Cases ==
At the beginning of 2011, in a case in Minnesota brought by Insignia Systems, News America faced more than $600 million in fines. The News Corporation paid out $125 million to settle the allegations of anticompetitive behavior and violations of antitrust laws. This was the third time that the two companies had been involved in lawsuits. In August 2000, Insignia was sued by News America regarding exclusive promotional agreements with several major supermarket retailers, a suit that was settled confidentially in November 2002. In November 2003 Insignia was sued again, regarding Insignia's right to market in-store advertising and promotional services.
