= Jeffrey E. Perelman =

American investor

- Education: Wharton School of the University of Pennsylvania (B.Sc. & MBA)
- Occupations: Businessman, investor, philanthropist
- Years active: 1970–present
- Title: Founder, Chairman and CEO, JEP Management
- Spouse: Marsha R. Perelman
- Children: 1
- Parent(s): Raymond G. Perelman; Ruth Perelman
- Relatives: Ronald Perelman (brother)

Jeffrey E. Perelman is an American businessman. He is the chairman and CEO of the JEP Management holding company. He is the son of Raymond G. Perelman, and the younger brother of Ronald O. Perelman.

== Education ==
Jeffrey Perelman holds both a Bachelor of Science in Economics and an MBA from the Wharton School of the University of Pennsylvania. He studied general business, with a focus on finance.

== Career ==
Through the JEP Management holding company, Perelman owns stakes in a variety of financial and industrial companies. He is CEO of DentalEZ Group, Columbia Dentoform, Schiller Grounds Care, Germantown Tool & Manufacturing Company, General Machine Corporation, United Ammunition Container and Mantis Europe.

He is a member of the American Advisory Board of Christie's International.

== Philanthropy ==
Perelman's philanthropic activities include supporting various schools at the University of Pennsylvania and other Philadelphia institutions, including the School of Dental Medicine, School of Design, the Institute of Contemporary Art and the Children's Hospital of Philadelphia. He is the Secretary of the Board of Trustees of the Children's Hospital of Philadelphia and a member of the Board of Trustees of the Dia Art Foundation.

== Personal life ==
Perelman is married to Marsha Reines Perelman.
