= California Federal Bank =

US retail bank and real estate lender

- Industry: Banking
- Founded: 1926 as Railway Mutual Building and Loan Association
- Defunct: November 13, 2002
- Fate: Acquired by Citigroup
- Headquarters: Los Angeles, California; San Francisco, California
- Total assets: $50.680 billion (2002)
- Parent: Cal Fed Bancorp (1995–1997); First Nationwide Holdings (1997–1998); Golden State Bancorp (1998–2002)
- Website: Last archive of official website in 2002

California Federal Bank, known as CalFed, was a retail bank and real estate lender headquartered in Los Angeles, California, that operated under a federal savings bank charter. In 2002, it operated 352 branches, most of which were in California, when acquired by Citigroup.

== Early History ==
The bank's origins can be traced to the Railway Mutual Building and Loan Association; formed on October 20, 1926, to serve employees of the Pacific Electric Railway, the light rail transit system ("red cars") that served Los Angeles and surrounding areas. The fledgling institution operated with a staff of three persons; assets at the end of the first year were $262,000.

Following passage of New Deal legislation that created the Federal Home Loan Bank System and the Federal Savings and Loan Insurance Corporation, Railway Mutual applied for a federal charter and adopted the name Railway Federal in 1936. A year later the S&L changed its name to California Federal and moved its headquarters to the Miracle Mile area of Los Angeles, when it embarked on a dramatic period of growth. Assets grew from $1 million to $100 million by 1954, when its first branch was opened in Reseda. Other branches were added to meet the post-World War II growth of Southern California.

California Federal became the nation's largest federally chartered S&L in 1959 following a merger with Standard Federal, which operated a sizeable bank-by-mail operation serving customers outside California. Their combined assets of $500 million then doubled in the next four years, surpassing the $1 billion mark in 1963. Two years later, Cal Fed occupied as its headquarters the lower half of the 27-story California Federal Plaza at 5670 Wilshire Blvd. The building, designed by architect Charles Luckman, was briefly the tallest high-rise in the city.

The institution began the 1970s with 18 offices and during the decade expanded statewide by acquiring smaller S&Ls and opening offices in San Diego, California's Central Valley and the San Francisco Bay area and Sacramento. In 1980, as bank deregulation began, California Federal was the fourth largest S&L in the state, with assets of $6.1 billion, deposits held in more than 800,000 savings accounts, and mortgages on 150,000 homes. About this period, the association began to officially use its widely known nickname (CalFed) for marketing purposes on a limited basis.

During the early 1980s, CalFed took advantage of new powers granted to S&Ls, including the issuance of adjustable-rate mortgages, checking accounts (negotiable orders of withdrawal), consumer loans and credit cards, as well as insurance and trust services through subsidiaries. In 1983, it converted from mutual to stock-ownership by raising $387 million—in what was then the second-largest IPO in the United States (exceeded only by the initial offering of Ford Motor Company). As part of federal efforts to deal with failing institutions, California Federal was enlisted to acquire (with financial guarantees) two small institutions in California and several in Florida and Georgia.

Cal Fed's two chief executives during its early years were J. Howard Edgerton, (attorney/manager for Railway Federal 1931-1939; CEO 1939-1969) and Robert R. Dockson, (joined as president 1969; CEO 1973-1989).

Note: CalFed was the plaintiff in a major Supreme Court ruling dealing with state versus federal labor law: See California Federal Savings and Loan Association v. Guerra

== Later History ==
Reflecting the substantial re-composition of its activities, in June 1989, California Federal Savings & Loan Association was renamed California Federal Bank.

In January 1993, the bank's stockholders voted to eliminate the bank's then holding company parent, CalFed Inc. (NYSE: CAL), as a means to raise more capital.

In 1994, the bank acquired Cornerstone Savings & Loan after it was shut down by regulators as a result of bank failure.

In August 1995, the bank reversed its 1993 decision to eliminate its holding company and formed Cal Fed Bancorp, Inc. (NYSE: CAL) as its new parent.

In 1997, First Nationwide Holdings Inc., the parent company of First Nationwide Bank, acquired the bank's then parent, Cal Fed Bancorp, and converted its First Nationwide Bank offices to the California Federal name. Since 1994, First Nationwide Holdings Inc. was owned 80% by Ronald Perelman and 20% by Gerald J. Ford.

In 1998, Golden State Bancorp (NYSE: GSB), the parent of Glendale Federal Bank, acquired the bank and moved the headquarters from Los Angeles to San Francisco with the merged institution using the California Federal Bank name. In 2000, the bank's auto loan subsidiary acquired Downey Auto Finance.

In 2002, Citigroup acquired the bank for $5.8 billion.
