= Mike Medavoy =

American film producer (born 1941)

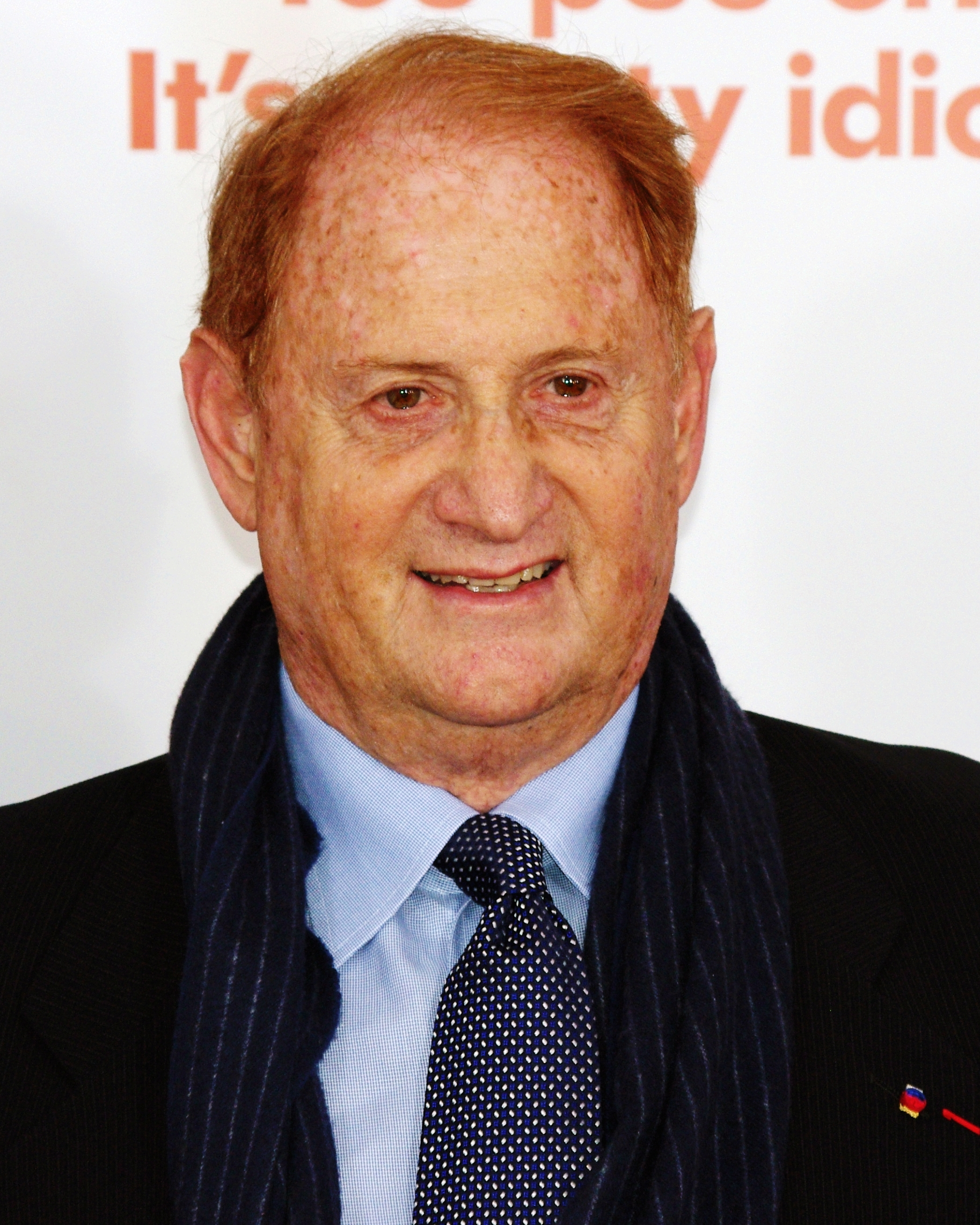
- Medavoy in May 2012
- Born: Morris Mike Medavoy; January 21, 1941 (age 85); Shanghai, China
- Occupations: Film producer; business executive
- Years active: 1964–present
- Spouses: Marcia Rogers (div.); Patricia Duff (m. 1986; div. 1994) Irena Gerasimenko (m. 1995)
- Children: 2, including Brian Medavoy

Morris Mike Medavoy (born January 21, 1941) is an American film producer and business executive. He co-founded Orion Pictures and currently serves as chairman and CEO of Phoenix Pictures. He previously held leadership roles at TriStar Pictures and United Artists.

== Early life ==
Morris Mike Medavoy was born in Shanghai on January 21, 1941, to Michael Medavoy, a garage mechanic, and Dora Medavoy, a dress shop owner whose clientele included Chinese actresses. His parents were Russian-speaking Ukrainian Jews; his mother was born in Harbin to immigrants from Odesa, and his father was originally from Ukraine. He has a younger sister named Ronnie.

The Medavoy family lived in Chile from 1947 to 1957, where Medavoy attended the Liceo Valentín Letelier de Santiago. They later moved to Los Angeles and lived with a relative. Medavoy became a U.S. citizen in 1963, the same year he graduated from UCLA. He joined the U.S. Army Reserve in 1963 and served at Fort Ord in California until 1969.

== Career ==
=== Early work ===
In 1964, Mike Medavoy began his career in the mailroom at Universal Studios. The following year, he became an agent at the General Artists Corporation and later joined Creative Management Associates (CMA). In 1967, he was appointed vice president of CMA’s motion picture department, where he worked with emerging filmmakers including Steven Spielberg and Francis Ford Coppola. In 1970, he moved to the International Famous Agency.

In 1974, Medavoy joined United Artists as senior vice president of production. During his tenure, the studio released several critically acclaimed films, including One Flew Over the Cuckoo's Nest (1975), Rocky (1976), and Annie Hall (1977), all of which won the Academy Award for Best Picture in their respective years.

=== Orion Pictures ===
In 1978, Medavoy co-founded Orion Pictures, a joint venture with Warner Bros. and former United Artists executives Arthur Krim, Robert Benjamin, Eric Pleskow, and William Bernstein. While at Orion, the company released several critically and commercially successful films, including Amadeus (1984), The Terminator (1984), Platoon (1986), RoboCop (1987), Dances With Wolves (1990), and The Silence of the Lambs (1991).

=== TriStar Pictures ===
In 1990, Medavoy was appointed chairman of TriStar Pictures. Under his leadership, the studio released films such as Philadelphia (1993), Terminator 2: Judgment Day (1991), Sleepless in Seattle (1993), Cliffhanger (1993), The Fisher King (1991), Legends of the Fall (1994), and Hook (1991). He left the company in 1994 following disagreements with Sony Pictures chairman Peter Guber.

=== Phoenix Pictures ===
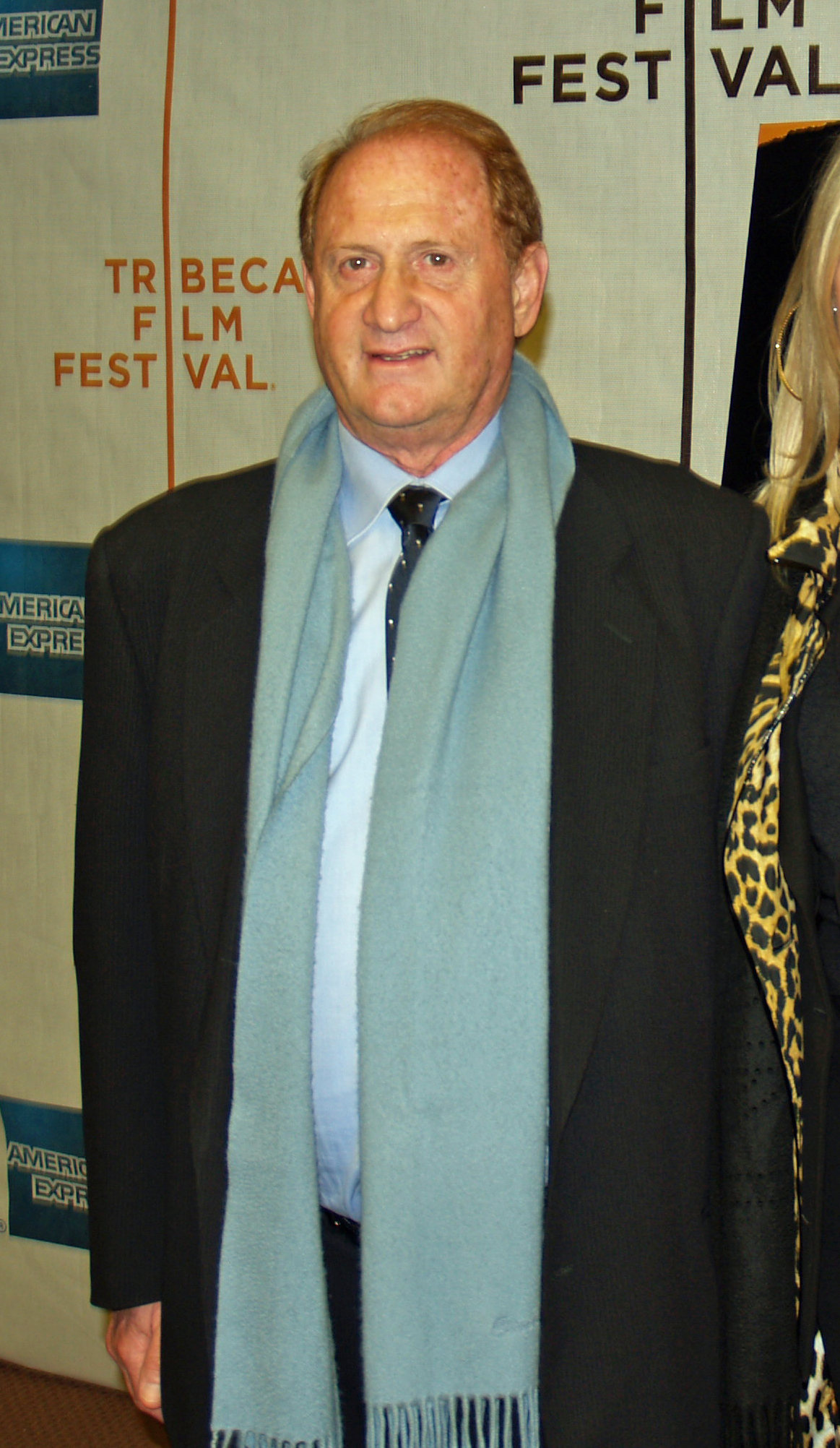
Medavoy at the 2007 Tribeca Film Festival

In 1995, Medavoy co-founded Phoenix Pictures with Arnold W. Messer, establishing the company under a production agreement with Sony Pictures Entertainment. As chairman and CEO, Medavoy was involved in the production of films such as The People vs. Larry Flynt (1996), The Thin Red Line (1998), and Zodiac (2007). Both The People vs. Larry Flynt and The Thin Red Line received Academy Award nominations. Other productions under Phoenix Pictures include Shutter Island (2010) and Black Swan (2010), both of which received critical acclaim.

In 2011, Medavoy announced a film project based on the 2010 Chilean mining accident, in which 33 miners were trapped underground for 69 days. He collaborated with Chilean officials and screenwriter José Rivera to develop the film, describing it as a story centered on perseverance and human resilience.

That same year, Medavoy partnered with the Shanghai Film Group on two projects: a feature film adaptation of the novel The Cursed Piano, and a six-hour miniseries titled Tears of a Sparrow, both focused on the experiences of Jewish refugees in Japanese-occupied China during World War II. He also worked on a film adaptation of Ray Bradbury’s novel Dandelion Wine .

In 2015, Medavoy and producer Eric Esrailian were announced as producers of The Promise (2016), a historical drama starring Oscar Isaac and Christian Bale.

== Community contributions and other memberships ==
Medavoy was appointed to the board of directors of the Museum of Science and Industry in Los Angeles by Governor Jerry Brown and served as a commissioner on the Los Angeles Board of Parks and Recreation, an appointment made by Mayor Richard Riordan. He is also a member of the board of directors at Tel Aviv University.

At the University of California, Los Angeles (UCLA), Medavoy serves on the board of trustees of the UCLA Foundation and participates in the Chancellor's Associates, the Dean's Advisory Board of the UCLA School of Theater, Film and Television, and the Alumni Association's Student Relations Committee.

He is the co-chairman of the Burkle Center for UCLA’s Center for International Relations and served for five years on the board of advisors at the John F. Kennedy School of Government at Harvard University. In 2002, Governor Gray Davis appointed him to the Executive Advisory Board of the California Anti-Terrorism Information Center. He is also a member of the Council on Foreign Relations and the Homeland Security Advisory Council.

Medavoy is a member of the advisory committee of the Baryshnikov Arts Center in New York and serves on the advisory board of the USC Center on Public Diplomacy. Alongside his wife, Irena Medavoy, he is involved with C.O.A.C.H. for Kids (Community Outreach Assistance for Children’s Health), a Cedars-Sinai Medical Center initiative that offers free medical care to underserved children. Irena Medavoy serves as the organization’s Executive Vice Chairman.

== Political views ==
Medavoy has supported the Democratic Party in various capacities. He served as co-finance chair for Gary Hart's 1988 presidential campaign and was involved in Bill Clinton’s presidential campaigns in 1992 and 1996. He also supported Barack Obama’s 2008 presidential campaign, during which his wife, Irena Medavoy, served as co-finance chair.

== Personal life ==
Medavoy was previously married to Marcia Rogers, the daughter of publicist Henry C. Rogers and former wife of actor Mark Goddard. The dates of their marriage and divorce are not publicly documented. They have no children together. Brian Medavoy (born 1965), who is also a film producer is from a previous relationship Mike Medavoy had.

In 1986, Medavoy married political consultant Patricia Duff; the couple divorced in 1993. He married Russian-American philanthropist and former model Irena Gerasimenko in 1995. They have a son named Nick.

Medavoy was a close friend of actor Marlon Brando and serves as a co-executor of Brando’s estate. In addition to his native Russian, he speaks Spanish, which he learned while living in Chile, and English, which he acquired after immigrating to the United States.

== Awards ==
In 2011, UNICEF and Oscar winner Sean Penn presented the Medavoy family a humanitarian award.

1. 1980 - Honored by the Society of Fellows of the Anti-Defamation League
2. 1992 - Motion Picture Pioneer of the Year Award
3. 1997 - UCLA Career Achievement Award
4. 1998 - The Cannes Film Festival Lifetime Achievement Award
5. 1999 - UCLA Neil H. Jacoby Award for Exceptional Contributions to Humanity
6. 2002 - Israeli Film Festival's Lifetime Achievement Award
7. 2004 - Florida Atlantic University's Louis B. Mayer Motion Picture Business Leader of the Year Award
8. 2004 - UCLA School of Theater, Film and Television Honorary Member Award
9. 2005 - Producers Guild of America Vision Award
10. 2005 - Inducted into the Hollywood Walk of Fame and received a star on Hollywood Blvd.
11. 2007 - Stella Adler Actors Studio Marlon Brando Award
12. 2008 - Jerusalem Film Foundation Lifetime Achievement Award
13. 2008 - International Student Film Festival Hollywood Lifetime Achievement Award
14. 2009 - Declared the honorary Doctorate at the Academy of Art in San Francisco
15. 2009 - Declared Chevalier of the French Government's Legion of Honor.
16. 2009 - Independent Spirit Award
17. 2010 - Bernardo O'Higgins award from the Chilean government
18. 2011 - The Locarno Film Festival Raimondo Rezzonico Prize (Locarno, Switzerland)
19. 2011 - Hebrew University Award
20. 2011 - Danny Kaye Humanitarian Award
21. 2012 - Shanghai International Film Festival – Outstanding Achievement Award
22. 2014 - Satellite Awards Mary Pickford Award - Outstanding Artistic Contribution to the Entertainment Industry
23. 2015 - Cinequest Maverick Spirit Award
24. 2016 - Peabody Award - Listen to Me Marlon
25. 2019 - RiverRun International Film Festival - Master of Cinema Award
26. 2019 - Beverly Hills Film Festival - Legends Award

== Membership in film organizations ==
Mike had membership in several film organizations, including:

1. Chairman of The Jury of the Tokyo Film Festival
2. Advisor to The Shanghai Film Festival
3. Advisor to The St. Petersburg Film Festival
4. Member of the Board of the Academy of Motion Pictures, Arts and Sciences from 1977 to 1981
5. One of the original founding members of the board of governors of the Sundance Institute (1978)
6. Chairman Emeritus of the American Cinematheque
7. Chairman Emeritus of the Stella Adler Actors Studio in New york

== Books ==
In 2002, Medavoy published a memoir titled You're Only As Good As Your Next One: 100 Great Films, 100 Good Films, and 100 for Which I Should Be Shot, co-written with Josh Young. The book was released by Simon & Schuster and later issued in paperback in 2003. It became a bestseller.

In 2009, Medavoy co-authored American Idol After Iraq: Competing for Hearts and Minds in the Global Media Age with Nathan Gardels, editor of The National Political Quarterly.

== Filmography ==
Medavoy was a producer on the following films unless otherwise noted.

=== Film ===
Year	Film	Credit
1997	U Turn	CEO of Phoenix Pictures
1998	Urban Legend	CEO of Phoenix Pictures
1998	The Thin Red Line	CEO of Phoenix Pictures
2000	The 6th Day	
2003	Basic	
2003	Holes	
2004	In My Country	
2005	Stealth	
2006	All the King's Men	
2006	Miss Potter	
2007	Pathfinder	
2007	Resurrecting the Champ	
2007	Zodiac	
2007	License to Wed	
2010	Shutter Island	
2010	Shanghai	
2010	Black Swan	
2012	What to Expect When You're Expecting	
2015	The 33	
2015	Absolutely Anything	Executive producer
2016	The Promise	
2023	The Last Voyage of the Demeter	
2023	Ozi: Voice of the Forest	
2026	I, Object	Executive producer

As an actor

Year	Film	Role
1971	The Christian Licorice Store	Hollywood Party Guest

Thanks

Year	Film	Role
2007	The Diving Bell and the Butterfly	Special thanks
2011	Homecoming	Thanks

=== Television ===
Year	Title	Credit	Notes
1996	Soul of the Game	Executive producer	Television film
1999	Shake, Rattle and Roll: An American Love Story	Executive producer	
2001	In the Time of the Butterflies	Executive producer	Television film
2002	The Outsider	Executive producer	Television film
2001−04	The Chris Isaak Show	Executive producer	
2011	The Dreamsters: Welcome to the Dreamery	Executive producer	Television film
2011	The Dreamsters	Executive producer	
2012	Shushybye Baby	Executive producer	
2017	The Long Road Home	Executive producer	
2018	Altered Carbon	Executive producer	

Thanks

Year	Title	Role
1998	Stories from My Childhood	Special thanks
