= M&F Worldwide =

Company based in New York City

M & F Worldwide
- Type: Subsidiary
- Industry: holding company
- Founded: June 1, 1988
- Headquarters: New York, New York, USA
- Key people: Barry F. Schwartz, CEO; Ronald O. Perelman
- Products: checks, licorice products
- Services: direct marketing, contact center
- Parent: MacAndrews & Forbes
- Subsidiaries: Harland Clarke Holdings Corp. Mafco

M&F Worldwide Corp. is a privately held holding company based in New York City. It was incorporated in Delaware on June 1, 1988. Formerly Power Control Technologies, Inc., the company was previously a New York Stock Exchange listed public holding company (MFW) that became part of the Ronald O. Perelman group of companies. It was acquired by private company MacAndrews & Forbes in 2011.

== History ==
Mafco Holdings acquired Abex, Inc., an aircraft control system & hydraulic pump manufacturer, and then merged it into a Mafco subsidiary in 1995 while the aerospace subsidiary, Power Control Technologies Inc., became publicly traded. Power Control then acquired Flavors Holdings Inc. in 1996 for $180 million, which included the licorice business subsidiary Mafco Worldwide Corp., which manufactures more than 70% of the worldwide licorice flavors.

An Abex, Inc. subsidiary, Pneumo Abex Inc., merged through multiple transactions with Mafco Worldwide. Power Control Technologies was renamed M & F Worldwide in 1997. In 2000, Perelman proposed that Mafco Holdings' major share in Panavision Inc. be sold to M & F Worldwide at Mafco Holdings' purchase price but was blocked by an M & F shareholder as the stock was trading at only 23% of that value.

In July 2013, the firm's main subsidiary, Harland Clarke, agreed to sell Harland Financial Solutions to Davis & Henderson for $1.2 billion. The acquisition was completed on August 16, 2013. In February 2020, Harland Clarke Holdings Corp. relaunched itself under the name Vericast, repositioning as an enterprise-level data and analytics business. The major businesses operating under the Vericast umbrella include Valassis, Harland Clarke, RetailMeNot, and QuickPivot.

== Subsidiaries ==
Logo of Harland Clarke

Name (state of Incorporation)

- Vericast Corp. (Delaware) – formerly Harland Clarke Holdings Corp., which was formerly CA Acquisition Holdings Inc.; rebranded as Vericast in February 2020
  - Harland Clarke Corp. (Delaware)
      - Checks in the Mail, Inc. (Delaware)
      - John H. Harland Company of Decatur (Georgia)
  - Harland Financial Solutions (Oregon)
  - HFS Scantron Holdings Corp. (New York)
    - Scantron Corporation (Delaware)
      - Data Management I LLC
  - Valassis
  - RetailMeNot
- Flavors Holdings Inc. (Delaware)
  - Mafco Worldwide Corp. (Delaware)
  - Mafco Shanghai Corp. (Delaware)
  - Pneumo Abex LLC (Delaware)
  - Pneumo Abex Lessee Corp. (Delaware)
  - Merisant Corp.
- PCT International Holdings Inc. (Delaware)
- EVD Holdings Inc. (Delaware)
- Concord Pacific Corp. (Maine)
- Centralia Holdings Corp. (Georgia)

=== Foreign ===
Name of Subsidiary (Jurisdiction)

- EVD Holdings S.A. (France)
- Extraits Vegetaux Et Derives, S.A. (France)
- Wei Feng Enterprises Ltd. (British Virgin Islands)
- Xianyang Concord Natural Products Co. Ltd. (People's Republic of China)
- Zhangjiagang Free Trade Zone MAFCO Liantai Biotech Co., Ltd. (People's Republic of China)
- Mafco Weihai Green Industry of Science and Technology Co. Ltd. (40% owned) (People's Republic of China)
- Scantron Canada, Ltd. (Canada)
- Harland Israel Ltd. (Israel)
- Harland Financial Solutions Worldwide Limited (Ireland)
