= SIGA Technologies =

American pharmaceutical

SIGA Technologies, Inc.
- Type: Public
- Traded as: Nasdaq: SIGA; Russell 2000 Component
- Industry: Healthcare; Biotechnology; Health security
- Founded: December 28, 1995; 30 years ago
- Headquarters: New York City, United States
- Key people: Diem Nguyen, Ph.D. (CEO); Dennis E. Hruby, Ph.D. (CSO)
- Products: Pharmaceutical agents
- Revenue: ▲$133.7 million (2021)
- Operating income: ▲$89.1 million (2021)
- Net income: ▲$69.5 million (2021)
- Number of employees: 39 (2022)
- Website: siga.com

SIGA Technologies, Inc. is an American pharmaceutical company founded in 1995, based in New York City, which develops and sells pharmaceutical solutions for the antiviral treatment of smallpox, monkeypox, cowpox, and vaccinia complications.

== History ==
In September 2009, SIGA Technologies received a $1.6 million research fund from the National Institutes of Health ("NIH") for its broad-spectrum antiviral candidates.

In August 2011, SIGA Technologies was awarded a $7.7 million grant from the National Institutes of Health (NIH) to develop an antiviral drug for treating and preventing Lassa fever and others of arenavirus origin. That year, it sealed a contract worth over $400 million to sell its antiviral drug Tpoxx to the United States Biomedical Advanced Research and Development Authority (BARDA) for the purpose of its development and distribution. Also in 2011, it was ordered to pay $232 million in damages in a legal dispute with PharmAthene over rights to the smallpox drug tecovirimat.

In July 2013, SIGA Technologies delivered about 590,000 courses of its smallpox antiviral drug tecovirimat (Arestvy) to the United States Government's Strategic National Stockpile (SNS), meeting the requirement of Government's Biomedical Advanced Research and Development Authority (BARDA).

In 2014, the company filed for Chapter 11 bankruptcy protection in a last-ditch effort to avoid paying a court bond after losing a contract lawsuit.

In May 2018, a US Food and Drug Administration (FDA) advisory committee decided that the benefits of SIGA's small molecule antiviral treatment, Tpoxx, outweigh its potential risks. Later in July, FDA granted the approval of Tpoxx to SIGA after the drug was evaluated in 359 healthy human volunteers. In July 2019, SIGA signed a $23 million contract with the United States Department of Defense to create Tpoxx's post-exposure prophylaxis. Tecovirimat was approved for medical use in the European Union in January 2022.

In 2021, SIGA submitted an intravenous version of Tpoxx to the FDA for approval, which was approved in May 2022.

In December 2021, Health Canada approved oral Tpoxx for the treatment of smallpox in adults and pediatric patients weighing at least 13kg.

In January 2022, the European Medicines Agency approved oral tecovirimat for smallpox, monkeypox, cowpox and vaccinia complications in adults and children with a body weight of at least 13kg.

Intravenous (IV) Tpoxx has no lower weight cap and can be used in infants under the Investigational New Drug protocol.

The Centers for Disease Control and Prevention and the FDA have relaxed regulations to make it easier for doctors in the United States to prescribe Tpoxx to treat people with monkeypox.

== Operations ==
SIGA has a well established cooperation with US federal agencies for its research and development activities. It provides countermeasures to the Strategic National Stockpile (SNS) and the Department of Defense (DoD), such as Category A pathogens using BSL-3 or -4 work. In September 2018, it signed a contract with BARDA for the delivery of oral and IV formulations of Tpoxx to the Strategic National Stockpile, effective for the following years.

== Products and services ==
SIGA's products include tecovirimat, sold under the brand name Tpoxx, the first drug approved by the FDA to treat adults and children for smallpox.

== Recognition ==
In 2008, SIGA won its fourth listing on the Deloitte Tri-State Area Technology Fast 50, then at #44.
