= RetailMeNot =

American multinational company

Coordinates: 30.26598°N 82.25588°E

RetailMeNot, Inc.
- Type: Subsidiary
- Industry: Cashback website, Online coupons
- Founded: October 27, 2006; 20 years ago Austin, Texas, U.S.
- Founder: Cotter Cunningham
- Headquarters: Austin, Texas, U.S.
- Area served: Worldwide
- Services: Online services
- Revenue: ▲US$ 249.1 million (2015)
- Number of employees: ~500 (2015)
- Parent: Ziff Davis
- Website: www.retailmenot.com/corp/

RetailMeNot, Inc. (formerly Whaleshark Media) is an American multinational company headquartered in Austin, Texas, that maintains a collection of coupon web sites. The company was founded by Cotter Cunningham. The company owns RetailMeNot.com and VoucherCodes.co.uk and acquires coupon sites and third-party software.

RetailMeNot was established to aggregate coupon offers and make them available to consumers. It distributes coupons in retail categories including accessories, automotive, baby products, beauty products, clothing, electronics, furniture, health, home and garden, jewelry, pets, photography, toys and travel.

== History ==
RetailMeNot was founded in 2006 by Australian entrepreneurs Guy King and Bevan Clark. The two had previously collaborated on BugMeNot, a site that allowed users to share fake identities in order to avoid website registrations and content paywalls, and a content management system. The company was acquired by Whaleshark Media in 2010. The company raised $300 million in funding from Austin Ventures, Norwest Venture Partners, Adams Street Partners, Institutional Venture Partners, JP Morgan and Google Ventures. Eventually acquiring the already established coupon site RetailMeNot.com from Australia, the company changed its name in 2013 to RetailMeNot.

As Whaleshark Media, the company acquired sites in the US and Europe. After changing its name to RetailMeNot in June 2013 for branding purposes, the company filed an IPO for $230 million in 2013. The company traded on Nasdaq's large-cap Global Select Market under the symbol SALE.

In April 2017, Harland Clarke Holdings (HCH), a payment and marketing services firm, announced to acquire RetailMeNot in a deal worth $630 million in equity. On February 6, 2020 HCH announced that it would relaunch itself as Vericast.

The company established annual National Cashback Day during the month of November where shoppers can receive up to 20% cash back on online purchases made on that day from about 300 national retailers such Banana Republic, Bloomingdale's, Estée Lauder, Gap, and Macy's.

In September 2020, RetailMeNot was in early talks with potential buyers, with a target price of between $500 and $600 million. On September 29, 2020, J2 Global, Inc.—a leading internet information services company—announced it entered into a purchase agreement to acquire RetailMeNot from Vericast for approximately $420 million. The acquisition was completed in October 2020.

== Legal issues ==
Mary Kay Cosmetics sued affiliate site RetailMeNot in federal court for displaying coupons on their site despite the fact they have been asked to take them down. Mary Kay's position is that the display of Mary Kay coupons misleads consumers and harms the brand and its relationship with its sales reps (independent consultants) in several ways. The lawsuit was resolved after several months by way of confidential settlement.

In June 2018, RetailMeNot sued competitor Honey Science Corporation over patent infringement in computer-related technologies. The case was dismissed with prejudice by a joint motion in October 2020.

In February 2025, RetailMeNot was hit with three class-action lawsuits alleging that it used cookie stuffing to take affiliate commissions.

== Acquisitions ==
RetailMeNot's acquisitions include:

- RetailMeNot.com, a digital coupon site in the United States
- eConversions, the parent company of Gutschein-Codes.de in Germany and VoucherCodes, a voucher code site in the United Kingdom
- Ma-Reduc.com and Poulpeo.com, digital coupon and cash back sites in France
- ZenDeals.com, a North American coupon site (October 9, 2013)
- Giftcard Zen Inc, a North American gift card exchange site (April 5, 2016)
- LowestMed, a North American prescription drug comparison site (May 8, 2018)
