= Valassis =

Company that provides media and marketing services

Valassis Communications, Inc.

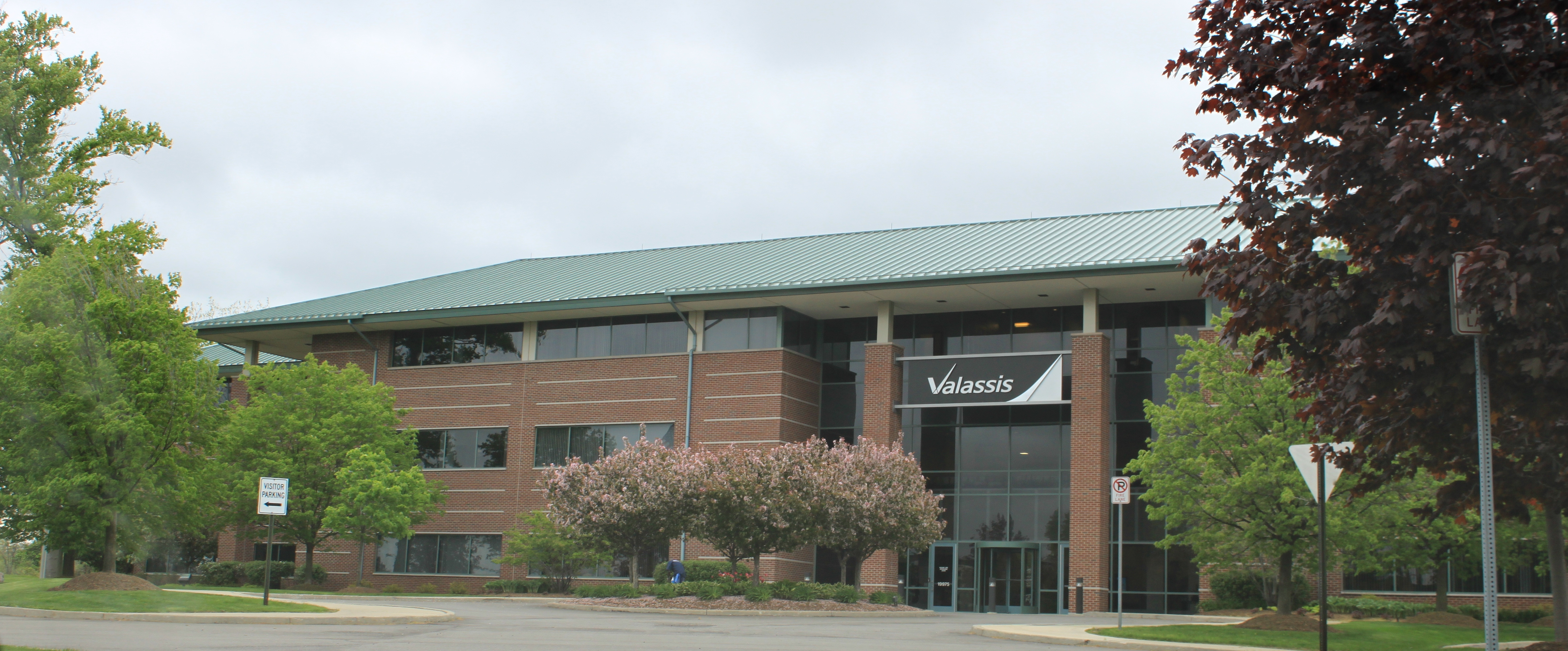
- Valassis headquarters in Livonia, Michigan
- Type: Subsidiary (since 2014)
- Industry: Advertising
- Founded: 1970; 56 years ago
- Headquarters: Livonia, Michigan, United States
- Parent: M&F Worldwide
- Website: valassis.com

Valassis Communications, Inc. is a Livonia, Michigan-based company that provides media and marketing services in the United States, Europe, Mexico, and Canada. It is one of the largest coupon distributors/processors in the world. Since 2020, Valassis has been unified under parent corporation, Vericast.

Valassis companies include Valassis Digital, Valassis Direct Mail, Inc., Valassis Canada, Promotion Watch and NCH Marketing Services, Inc. It has approximately 7,000 employees in 28 states and nine countries.

Valassis has relationships with more than 15,000 advertisers worldwide in various industries, including automotive, consumer electronics, consumer packaged goods, financial services, franchise food, grocery, specialty retail, and telecommunications.

In February 2014, Harland Clarke Holdings, a subsidiary of M&F Worldwide, completed purchase of Valassis for about $1.8 billion. Before this, Valassis had been a publicly traded corporation.

== History ==
Valassis was started by George Valassis in 1970 and it purchased its first printing press in 1971. In 1986 it was acquired by Consolidated Press Holdings (CPH) of Sydney, Australia, owned by Kerry Packer. In 1992 CPH took the company public on the New York Stock Exchange as Valassis Communications, Inc. (VCI). In 1997, CPH, which had kept 49% ownership in 1992, divested its interest in VCI, making the company fully independent.

In 2001, Valassis closed Save.com, an Internet coupon website that had launched in September 1999, saying that Save.com was unable to gain a "critical mass of advertisers interested in an Internet couponing vehicle." In 2003, Valassis acquired NCH Marketing Services, Inc., a coupon clearing and marketing services company with offices in France, Italy, Spain, Germany, England, United States and Mexico making Valassis an international company.

On Oct 17, 2005, Valassis became the recipient of a Caleidoscope of Culture Award (COCA), which recognized southeastern Michigan organizations and businesses for their ongoing efforts and steadfast commitment to diversity.

In early 2006, Valassis settled a complaint by the U.S. Federal Trade Commission that it had attempted to collude with News America Marketing, its top rival, to eliminate competition between the two. Under a consent order, Valassis was barred from engaging in similar conduct.

In 2007, Valassis's purchased Advo, a direct-mail marketer, for $1.2 billion. Valassis had sued to get out of the acquisition, saying it had found problems with Advo's financial figures, but the purchase was completed.

In December 2008, Fraser Papers sued Valassis for nearly $1 million, allegedly due to unpaid bills for 1.8 million pounds of specialty paper. Valassis settled the case in March 2009 for an undisclosed amount.

In 2010, News Corporation paid $500 million to settle a case brought against it by Valassis in federal court, after Valassis had won a $300 million verdict in state court in Michigan against News America Marketing, a subsidiary of News Corporation. The lawsuits by Valassis were based on claims that News America had gained market share by forcing its packaged-goods customers to sign long-term insert contracts or risk huge price increases on their in-store advertising displays. The settlement included News America entering into a 10-year shared mail distribution agreement with Valassis Direct Mail, a Valassis subsidiary.

Valassis purchased Clipper Magazine and Total Loyalty Solutions in November 2015.

Valassis recent acquisition in 2017 is Digital Marketing Technology Company MaxPoint.

== RedPlum/RetailMeNot Everyday ==
RedPlum was the consumer-facing brand of Valassis. According to the company, RedPlum's newspaper inserts and direct mailings reach more than 100 million consumers a week, without consent. Redplum.com is a savings and lifestyle site launched in January 2008. The site is targeted at women ages 25 to 50. Registered members receive a bi-weekly e-newsletter featuring deals and offers.

In 2018, RetailMeNot became a partner in Valassis' FSI holdings, renaming RedPlum to RetailMeNot Everyday.

== America's Looking For Its Missing Children Program ==
In partnership with the National Center for Missing & Exploited Children (NCMEC) and the U.S. Postal Service, Valassis distributes pictures of missing children as part of its "Have You Seen Me?" picture program. The program was launched on May 24, 1985, featuring missing Pennsylvania girl Cherrie Mahan on their first flyer.

The "Have You Seen Me?" program is currently responsible for 87% of the leads called in to NCMEC. According to NCMEC, photos are the number one tool that parents and law enforcement officials have in their search for missing children. By featuring recent and/or age-progressed photos of missing children, and their alleged abductors when possible, Valassis empowers the American public to take part in the effort to help safely recover these children. Of the 2,000 children featured in programs such as "Have You Seen Me?", more than 1,200 have been recovered.

=== NCMEC history ===
- Inspired by the September 1984 (October 1983?) premiere of the TV movie Adam, the company developed a public service program plan to assist local and national efforts to locate missing children through the mass distribution of pictures.
- The U.S. Postal Service changed its postal regulations in March 1985 to allow pictures and data of missing children provided by the NCMEC to appear on detached address labels.
- In an effort to remember all children still not recovered, the company initiated a white ribbon campaign on May 25, 1992 – now designated as National Missing Children's Day.
- In January 1997, the company secured the participation of its regional direct mail companies to expand the program's reach to 17 million additional households.
- The company began targeting its photo distribution in April 1998 to leverage the NCMEC's and the FBI's intelligence, when possible, on the likely whereabouts of a missing child. A child's photo can now be targeted to any one of six regions of the country, or distributed nationwide over a six-week period.
- On Sept. 19, 2000, the 100th safe recovery was celebrated with an event hosted by Speaker of the U.S. House of Representatives Dennis Hastert on Capitol Hill. Attending were John Walsh, host of America's Most Wanted, Members of Congress, representatives of the U.S. Postal Service and the NCMEC, as well as the 100th recovered child and her mother.
- In May 2007, the photo program moved from the detached address label to a full-color position on the direct mail piece itself.
- In January 2008, the program expanded from the RedPlum Direct Mail Package to also include the RedPlum Free-standing Insert, increasing its reach to potentially 130-140 million households as well as online.
