= Gerald J. Ford =

American lawyer

- Born: 1944 (age 81–82); Pampa, Texas, U.S.
- Education: Southern Methodist University
- Occupations: Chairman & CEO
- Known for: Gerald J. Ford Stadium

Gerald J. Ford (born 1944) is an American attorney and businessman.

== Biography ==
=== Early life ===
Gerald Ford was raised in Pampa, Texas, and attended Pampa Senior High School. He graduated from Southern Methodist University in the Dallas enclave of University Park, Texas in 1966, where he was a member of the Alpha Tau Omega fraternity. He received a J.D. from the SMU School of Law in 1969.

=== Career ===
He is the former chairman of the board and chief executive officer of Golden State Bancorp, Inc., headquartered in San Francisco. It was a holding company for the nation's second-largest thrift institution and California's fourth-largest bank. In 2002, he sold it to Citigroup for $6 billion. He is currently chairman of the board of Hilltop Holdings, a bank and insurance holding company. He is also the non-executive chairman of the Board of Directors of Freeport-McMoRan (FCX), the world's largest publicly traded extractor of copper and gold.

He has also invested in First Acceptance Corporation, Pacific Capital Bancorp (Annual Sales $13 billion), Golden State Bancorp, FSB (federal savings bank that merged with Citigroup in 2002) Rio Hondo Land & Cattle Company (annual sales $1.6 million), Diamond Ford, Dallas (sales: $200 million), Scientific Games Corp., SWS Group (annual sales: $422 million); American Residential Cmnts LLC. His other investments include the auto-finance company AmeriCredit, Pacific Capital Bancorp and 120,000 acres (486 km^{2}) of rangeland in New Mexico.

Ford has a history of buying banks, reorganizing them, and subsequently selling them at a substantial profit, with Golden State Bancorp and then bailed-out Pacific Capital Bancorp, being his most notable wins.

In a 2010 interview on entrepreneurship with Forbes, he suggested reading The Great Gatsby by F. Scott Fitzgerald, The Financier by Theodore Dreiser, The Bonfire of the Vanities by Tom Wolfe, Too Big to Fail by Andrew Ross Sorkin and The Big Short by Michael Lewis.

=== Philanthropy ===
He has been a member of Southern Methodist University's board of trustees since 1992. He is chair of the board's finance committee and a member of its executive committee, trusteeship committee, committee on athletics and executive committee of the Campaign for SMU. He also currently serves as co-chair of the Dedman College Campaign Committee and on the executive board of Dedman School of Law. He is a former member of the executive boards of Dedman College of Humanities and Sciences, Cox School of Business, John Goodwin Tower Center for Political Studies and Willis M. Tate Distinguished Lecture Series. He has also served as a regent for the Texas A&M University System. He donated $20 million to build the new football stadium at SMU, named the Gerald J. Ford Stadium. He also donated $10 million to the Weill Cornell Medical College at Cornell University. More recently, Ford played a role in SMU's 2024 move from the American Athletic Conference to the Atlantic Coast Conference (ACC). He was one of a group of roughly 15 boosters who committed to donating enough to the SMU athletic program to allow the school to forego any ACC media revenue for its first nine years as an ACC member.

=== Personal life ===
He is married and has six children. His wife, Kelli, is an interior designer. They live in Dallas, and have homes in Manhattan, New York City and The Hamptons, a working ranch in New Mexico, and a thoroughbred farm in Kentucky. In 2012, they sold their Beverly Hills, California property to Byron Allen. As of September 2022, he is worth an estimated US $2.3 billion.
