= Denatonium =

Extremely bitter chemical compound

Denatonium benzoate Denatonium saccharinate
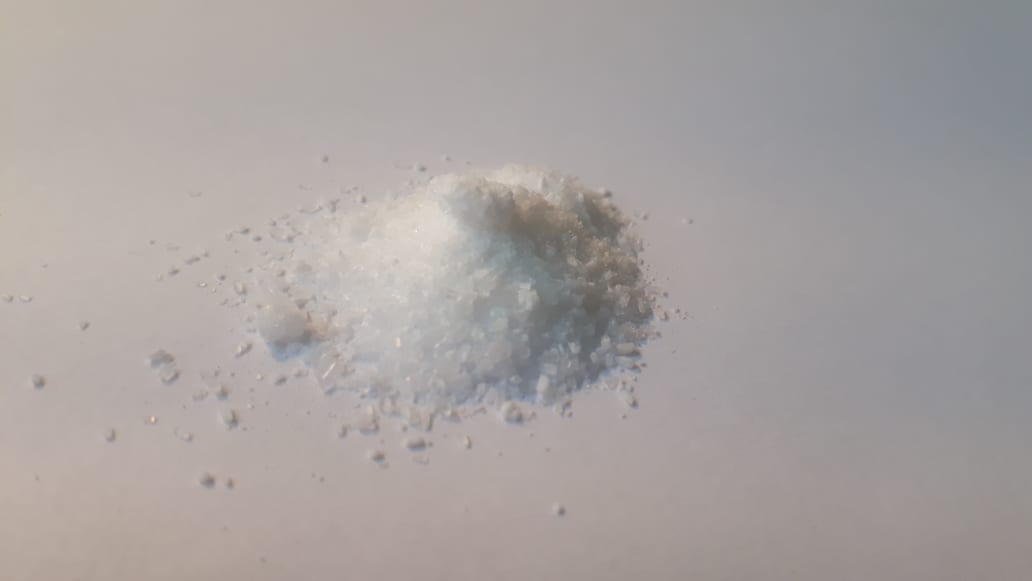

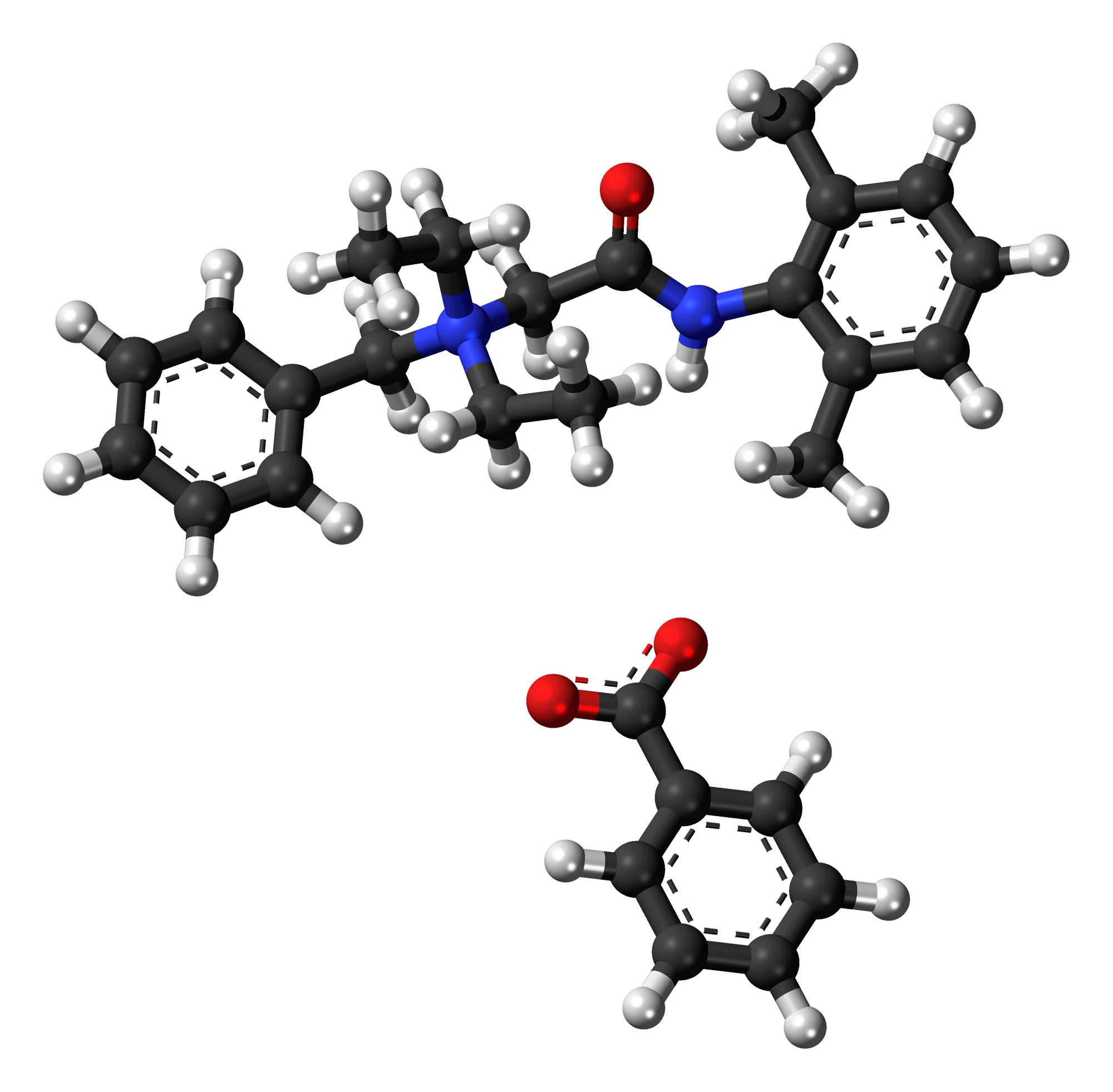

Names
- Preferred IUPAC name N-Benzyl-2-(2,6-dimethylanilino)-N,N-diethyl-2-oxoethan-1-aminium benzoate
- Other names N-Benzyl-2-[(2,6-dimethylphenyl)amino]-N,N-diethyl-2-oxoethan-1-aminium benzoate

Identifiers
CAS Number	3734-33-6
3D model (JSmol)	Interactive image
ChEMBL	ChEMBL1371493
ChemSpider	18392
ECHA InfoCard	100.020.996
EC Number	223-095-2
PubChem CID	19518
UNII	M5BA6GAF1O
CompTox Dashboard (EPA)	DTXSID8034376
- InChI: InChI=1S/C21H28N2O.C7H6O2/c1-5-23(6-2,15-19-13-8-7-9-14-19)16-20(24)22-21-17(3)11-10-12-18(21)4;8-7(9)6-4-2-1-3-5-6/h7-14H,5-6,15-16H2,1-4H3;1-5H,(H,8,9) Key: VWTINHYPRWEBQY-UHFFFAOYSA-N; InChI=1/C21H28N2O.C7H6O2/c1-5-23(6-2,15-19-13-8-7-9-14-19)16-20(24)22-21-17(3)11-10-12-18(21)4;8-7(9)6-4-2-1-3-5-6/h7-14H,5-6,15-16H2,1-4H3;1-5H,(H,8,9) Key: VWTINHYPRWEBQY-UHFFFAOYAY
- SMILES: [O-]C(=O)c1ccccc1.Cc2cccc(C)c2NC(=O)C[N+](CC)(CC)Cc3ccccc3

Properties
Chemical formula	C_{28}H_{34}N_{2}O_{3}
Molar mass	446.581
Appearance	white crystalline
Melting point	163 to 170 °C (325 to 338 °F; 436 to 443 K)

Hazards
- GHS labelling
Pictograms	(GHS05: Corrosive) (GHS07: Exclamation mark)
Signal word	Danger
Hazard statements	H302, H315, H318, H332, H412
Precautionary statements	P261, P264, P270, P271, P273, P280, P301+P312, P302+P352, P304+P312, P304+P340, P305+P351+P338, P310, P312, P321, P330, P332+P313, P362, P501
NFPA 704 (fire diamond)	1 1 0
- Except where otherwise noted, data are given for materials in their standard state (at 25 °C [77 °F], 100 kPa). verify (what is ?) Infobox references

Denatonium is an organic ion and one of the bitterest chemical compounds known, with bitterness thresholds of 0.05 ppm for the benzoate and 0.01 ppm for the saccharinate. Commercially, it is usually available in salts such as denatonium benzoate (under trade names such as Denatrol, BITTERANT-b, BITTER+PLUS, Bitrex, Bitrix, Toxishield and Aversion) or as denatonium saccharinate (BITTERANT-s).

Denatonium was discovered in 1958 during research on local anesthetics by T. & H. Smith of Edinburgh, Scotland, and registered under the trademark Bitrex.

Dilutions of as little as 10 ppm are unbearably bitter to most people. Denatonium salts are usually colorless and odorless solids, but are often traded as solutions. They are used as aversive agents (bitterants) to prevent accidental ingestion. Denatonium is used in denatured alcohol, antifreeze, preventive nail biting preparations, respirator mask fit-testing, animal repellents, liquid soaps, shampoos, button cells and Nintendo Switch game cards to prevent accidental swallowing or choking by children. It is not known to pose any long-term health risks.

The name denatonium reflects the substance's primary use as a denaturant and its chemical nature as a cation, hence -onium as a Neo-Latin suffix.

== Structure, synthesis, and physical properties ==
Denatonium is a quaternary ammonium cation. It is composed as a salt with any of several anions, such as benzoate or saccharinate. It can be obtained by the quaternization of lidocaine, a popular anesthetic, with benzyl chloride or a similar reagent. To obtain other salts, like the benzoate, the formed denatonium chloride is subjected to an anion exchange reaction with sodium benzoate, or first sodium hydroxide to make denatonium hydroxide followed by neutralization with benzoic acid. Other similar compounds are procaine and benzocaine.

== Biochemistry ==
Denatonium in humans is recognized by eight distinct bitter taste receptors: TAS2R4, TAS2R8, TAS2R10, TAS2R39, TAS2R43, TAS2R16, TAS2R46, and TAS2R47, being by far the most sensitive to the compound.

Denatonium can act as a bronchodilator by activating bitter taste receptors in the airway smooth muscle.

In chickens, over-activation of the bitter taste receptors by denatonium (added to food) causes apoptosis of the jejunal epithelial cells.

=== Detection by animals ===
Animals are known to have different sensitivities to the effects of denatonium.

Humans are able to detect denatonium at much lower concentrations than rodents.

Dog taste receptors have much lower sensitivity to denatonium in vitro compared to human ones.

Denatonium is recognized not only by human bitter taste receptors, but also by taste receptors from cartilaginous fishes (sharks and rays) in vitro, which diverged from humans about 462 million years ago and belongs to a different branch of the jawed vertebrates.

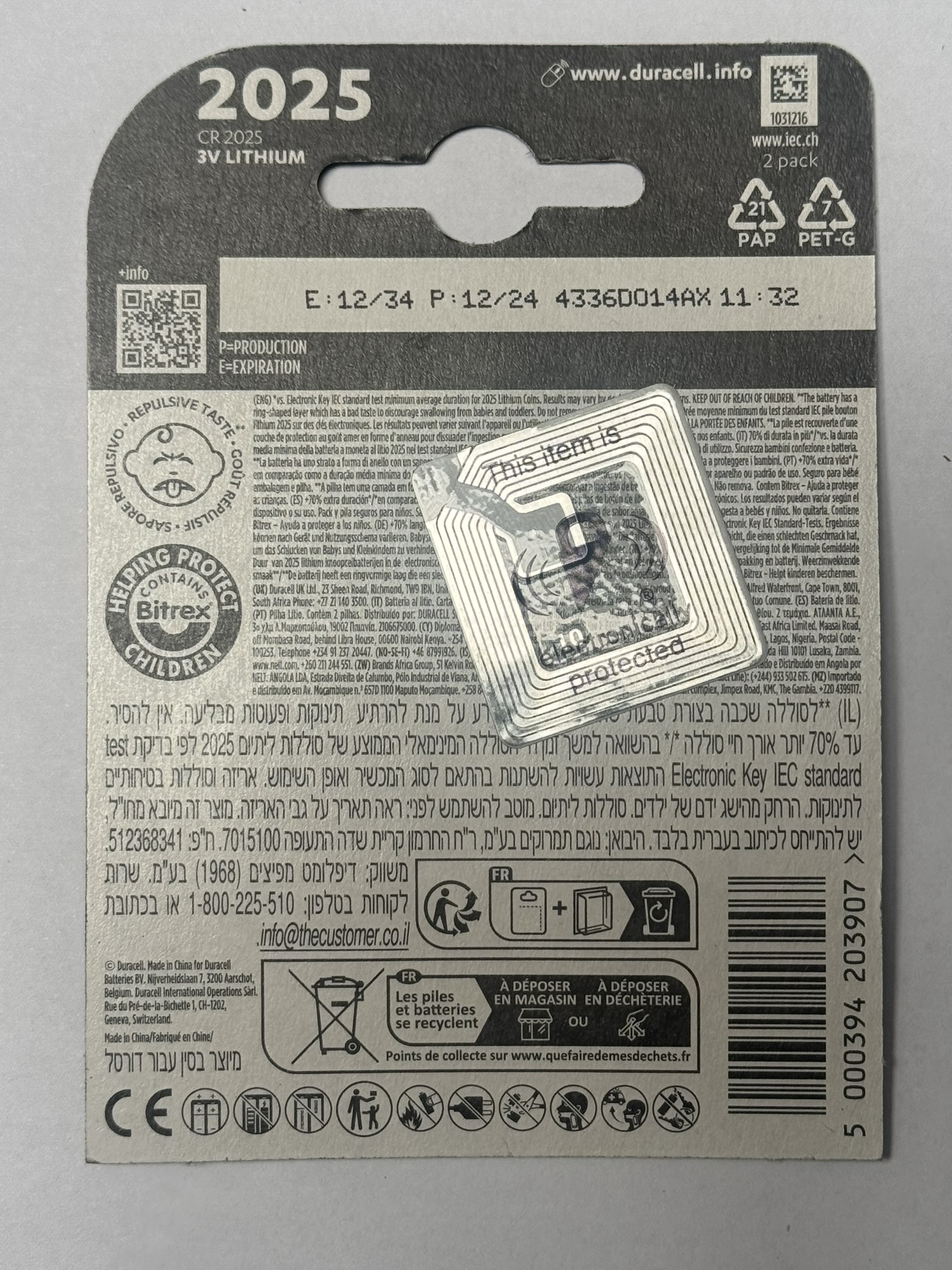
The reverse side of a Duracell 2025 coin cell 2-pack sold in the United Kingdom, showing the Bitrex logo and an indicator of its "repulsive taste". The graphic is at the upper left side of the card.

== Applications ==
The bitterness of the compound guides most applications of denatonium. Denatonium benzoate is used to denature ethanol so that it cannot be consumed recreationally, exempting it from alcoholic beverage taxes and sales restrictions. One designation in particular, SD-40B, indicates that ethanol has been denatured using denatonium benzoate.

Denatonium is commonly included in placebos used in clinical trials to mimic the bitter taste of certain medications.

Denatonium benzoate is an ingredient in certain nail polishes and varnishes designed to discourage nail biting, as the bitter denatonium serves as an aversive.

Denatonium also discourages consumption of poisonous alcohols such as methanol and additives such as ethylene glycol. It is also added to many kinds of harmful liquids, including solvents (such as nail polish remover), paints, varnishes, toiletries and other personal care items, and various other household products. It is also added to less hazardous aerosol products (such as gas dusters) to discourage inhalant abuse of the volatile vapors.

In 1995, the U.S. state of Oregon required that denatonium benzoate be added to products containing sweet-tasting ethylene glycol and methanol such as antifreeze and windshield washer fluid to prevent poisonings of children and animals. In December 2012, U.S. manufacturers voluntarily agreed to add denatonium benzoate to antifreeze sold nationwide.

It is used in some animal repellents (especially for such large mammals as deer). It has been used to safeguard rat poisons from human consumption, as human taste is more sensitive to the compound.

Nintendo Switch and Nintendo Switch 2 game cartridges are coated in denatonium benzoate to prevent young children from consuming them, intentionally or not.

Lithium button cells, which can cause severe internal injuries if swallowed, are sometimes coated with denatonium benzoate to discourage small children from swallowing them.

== See also ==
- Amarogentin — a naturally-occurring substance which is also extraordinarily bitter
- Oligoporin D — the bitterest known substance as of 2025
