= Taste receptor =

Type of cellular receptor that facilitates taste

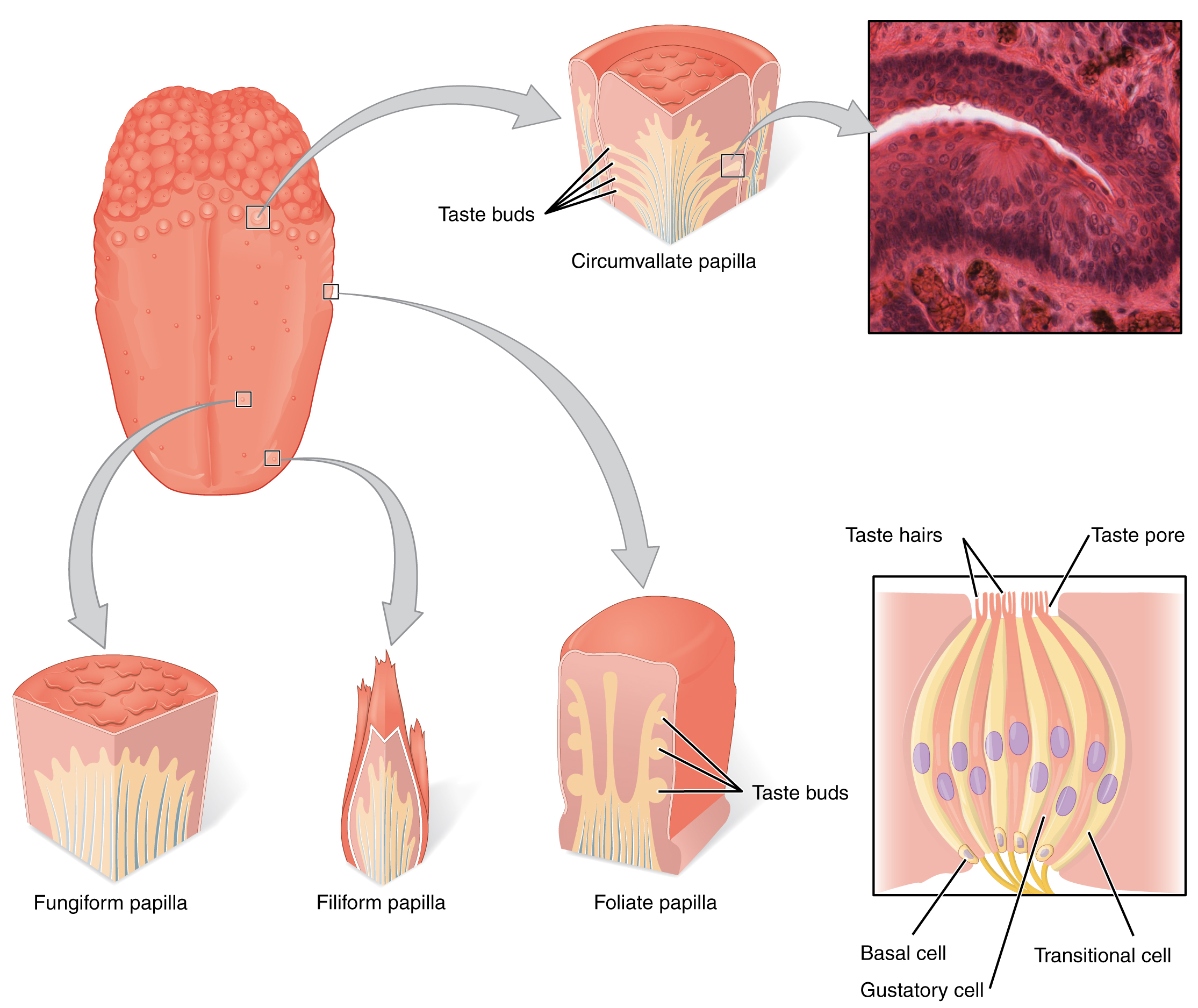
- Taste receptors of the tongue are present in the taste buds of papillae.

Identifiers
- FMA: 84662

A taste receptor is a type of cellular receptor that facilitates the sensation of taste. When food or other substances enter the mouth, molecules interact with saliva and are bound to taste receptors in the oral cavity and other locations. Molecules which give a sensation of taste are considered "sapid".

Vertebrate taste receptors are divided into two families:

- Type 1, sweet, first characterized in 1999: TAS1R2 – TAS1R3
- Type 2, bitter, first characterized in 2000: In humans there are 25 known different bitter receptors, in cats there are 12, in chickens there are three, and in mice there are 35 known different bitter receptors.

Visual, olfactive, "sapictive" (the perception of tastes), trigeminal (hot, cool), mechanical, all contribute to the perception of taste. Of these, transient receptor potential cation channel subfamily V member 1 (TRPV1) vanilloid receptors are responsible for the perception of heat from some molecules such as capsaicin, and a CMR1 receptor is responsible for the perception of cold from molecules such as menthol, eucalyptol, and icilin.

== Tissue distribution ==
The gustatory system consists of taste receptor cells in taste buds. Taste buds, in turn, are contained in structures called papillae. There are three types of papillae involved in taste: fungiform papillae, foliate papillae, and circumvallate papillae. (The fourth type - filiform papillae do not contain taste buds). Beyond the papillae, taste receptors are also in the palate and early parts of the digestive system like the larynx and upper esophagus. There are three cranial nerves that innervate the tongue; the vagus nerve, glossopharyngeal nerve, and the facial nerve. The glossopharyngeal nerve and the chorda tympani branch of the facial nerve innervate the TAS1R and TAS2R taste receptors. Next to the taste receptors in on the tongue, the gut epithelium is also equipped with a subtle chemosensory system that communicates the sensory information to several effector systems involved in the regulation of appetite, immune responses, and gastrointestinal motility.

In 2010, researchers found bitter receptors in lung tissue, which cause airways to relax when a bitter substance is encountered. They believe this mechanism is evolutionarily adaptive because it helps clear lung infections, but could also be exploited to treat asthma and chronic obstructive pulmonary disease.

The sweet taste receptor (T1R2/T1R3) can be found in various extra-oral organs throughout the human body such as the brain, heart, kidney, bladder, nasal respiratory epithelium and more. In most of the organs, the receptor function is unclear. The sweet taste receptor found in the gut and in the pancreas was found to play an important role in the metabolic regulation of the gut carbohydrate-sensing process and in insulin secretion. This receptor is also found in the bladder, suggesting that consumption of artificial sweeteners which activates this receptor might cause excessive bladder contraction.

== Function ==
Taste helps to identify toxins, maintain nutrition, and regulate appetite, immune responses, and gastrointestinal motility. Five basic tastes are recognized today: salty, sweet, bitter, sour, and umami. Salty and sour taste sensations are both detected through ion channels. Sweet, bitter, umami, and fat taste, however, are detected by way of G protein-coupled taste receptors.

In addition, some agents can function as taste modifiers, as miraculin or curculin for sweet or sterubin to mask bitter.

== Mechanism of action ==
The standard bitter, sweet, or umami taste receptor is a G protein-coupled receptor with seven transmembrane domains. Ligand binding at the taste receptors activate second messenger cascades to depolarize the taste cell. Gustducin is the most common taste Gα subunit, having a major role in TAS2R bitter taste reception. Gustducin is a homologue for transducin, a G-protein involved in vision transduction. Additionally, taste receptors share the use of the TRPM5 ion channel, as well as a phospholipase PLCβ2.

=== Savory or glutamates (Umami) ===
The TAS1R1+TAS1R3 heterodimer receptor functions as an umami receptor, responding to L-amino acid binding, especially L-glutamate. The umami taste is most frequently associated with the food additive monosodium glutamate (MSG) and can be enhanced through the binding of inosine monophosphate (IMP) and guanosine monophosphate (GMP) molecules. TAS1R1+3 expressing cells are found mostly in the fungiform papillae at the tip and edges of the tongue and palate taste receptor cells in the roof of the mouth. These cells are shown to synapse upon the chorda tympani nerves to send their signals to the brain, although some activation of the glossopharyngeal nerve has been found.

Alternative candidate umami taste receptors include splice variants of metabotropic glutamate receptors, mGluR4 and mGluR1, and the NMDA receptor.

Not all animals use T1R1+T1R3 as the umami receptor; shifts in what a receptor detects often happen with evolution. For examples, sweet-sensing songbirds have repurposed their umami receptor into a sweet receptor.

Almost every major vertebrate lineage uses a TAS1R to detect amino acids, a signal of the nutritional quality of food. However, glutamate is not among the more commonly-detected amino acids; instead, early vertebrates may have focused on basic and branched-chain amino acids, as this was the shared preference among bichir and elephant shark, representative of the bony and cartilaginous fishes respectively.

=== Sweet ===
The diagram above depicts the signal transduction pathway of the sweet taste. Object A is a taste bud, object B is one taste cell of the taste bud, and object C is the neuron attached to the taste cell. I. Part I shows the reception of a molecule. 1. Sugar, the first messenger, binds to a protein receptor on the cell membrane. II. Part II shows the transduction of the relay molecules. 2. G Protein-coupled receptors, second messengers, are activated. 3. G Proteins activate adenylate cyclase, an enzyme, which increases the cAMP concentration. Depolarization occurs. 4. The energy, from step 3, is given to activate the K+, potassium, protein channels.III. Part III shows the response of the taste cell. 5. Ca+, calcium, protein channels is activated. 6. The increased Ca+ concentration activates neurotransmitter vesicles. 7. The neuron connected to the taste bud is stimulated by the neurotransmitters.

The TAS1R2+TAS1R3 heterodimer receptor functions as the sweet receptor by binding to a wide variety of sugars and sugar substitutes. TAS1R2+3 expressing cells are found in circumvallate papillae and foliate papillae near the back of the tongue and palate taste receptor cells in the roof of the mouth. These cells are shown to synapse upon the chorda tympani and glossopharyngeal nerves to send their signals to the brain.

Sensing of the sweet taste has changed throughout the evolution of different animals. The T1R2/T1R3 setup is used by mammals and lizards. In birds, however, the T1R2 gene family does not exist and they sense the sweet taste through T1R1/T1R3 (the umami receptor in mammals). In teleost fish, neither T1R1/T1R3 or T1R2/T1R3 detect sweetness (sucrose). In the bichir, T1R1/T1R3 detects both sucralose and amino acids, and T1R2/T1R3 only detects amino acids. The bird T1R1/T1R3 underwent a process of repurposing: along the evolution stages of sweet-sensing songbirds, there was a decrease in its ability to sense the umami taste, and an increase in the ability to sense the sweet taste. The primordial songbird T1R1/T1R3 would have only tasted umami. This shift corresponded with a change in the structure of the ligand binding site.

=== Bitter ===
The TAS2R proteins (InterPro: IPR007960) function as bitter taste receptors. There are 43 human TAS2R genes, each of which (excluding the five pseudogenes) lacks introns and codes for a GPCR protein. These proteins, as opposed to TAS1R proteins, have short extracellular domains and are located in circumvallate papillae, palate, foliate papillae, and epiglottis taste buds, with reduced expression in fungiform papillae. Though it is certain that multiple TAS2Rs are expressed in one taste receptor cell, it is still debated whether mammals can distinguish between the tastes of different bitter ligands. Some overlap must occur, however, as there are far more bitter compounds than there are TAS2R genes. In silico modelling results suggest that bitterness receptors tend to cluster into three distinct groups based on their interaction with bitter ligands relevant to wine. Common bitter ligands include cycloheximide, denatonium, PROP (6-n-propyl-2-thiouracil), PTC (phenylthiocarbamide), and β-glucopyranosides.

Signal transduction of bitter stimuli is accomplished via the α-subunit of gustducin. This G protein subunit activates a taste phosphodiesterase and decreases cyclic nucleotide levels. Further steps in the transduction pathway are still unknown. The βγ-subunit of gustducin also mediates taste by activating IP_{3} (inositol triphosphate) and DAG (diglyceride). These second messengers may open gated ion channels or may cause release of internal calcium. Though all TAS2Rs are located in gustducin-containing cells, knockout of gustducin does not completely abolish sensitivity to bitter compounds, suggesting a redundant mechanism for bitter tasting (unsurprising given that a bitter taste generally signals the presence of a toxin). One proposed mechanism for gustducin-independent bitter tasting is via ion channel interaction by specific bitter ligands, similar to the ion channel interaction which occurs in the tasting of sour and salty stimuli.

One of the best-researched TAS2R proteins is TAS2R38, which contributes to the tasting of both PROP and PTC. It is the first taste receptor whose polymorphisms are shown to be responsible for differences in taste perception. Current studies are focused on determining other such taste phenotype-determining polymorphisms. More recent studies show that genetic polymorphisms in other bitter taste receptor genes influence bitter taste perception of caffeine, quinine and denatonium benzoate.

The diagram depicted above shows the signal transduction pathway of the bitter taste. Bitter taste has many different receptors and signal transduction pathways. Bitter indicates poison to animals. It is most similar to sweet. Object A is a taste bud, object B is one taste cell, and object C is a neuron attached to object B. I. Part I is the reception of a molecule.1. A bitter substance such as quinine, is consumed and binds to G Protein-coupled receptors.II. Part II is the transduction pathway 2. Gustducin, a G protein second messenger, is activated. 3. Phosphodiesterase, an enzyme, is then activated. 4. Cyclic nucleotide, cNMP, is used, lowering the concentration 5. Channels such as the K+, potassium, channels, close.III. Part III is the response of the taste cell. 6. This leads to increased levels of Ca+. 7. The neurotransmitters are activated. 8. The signal is sent to the neuron.

It has been demonstrated that bitterness receptors (TAS2R) play an important role in an innate immune system of airway (nose and sinuses) ciliated epithelium tissues. The innate immune system adds an "active fortress" to the physical immune system surface barrier, in which the binding of specific ligands initiates a signalling cascade to destroy pathogens using nitric oxide and defensins. Since some fixed immune system receptors are identical to the bitter taste receptors, TAS2R, bitter substances are agonists of the innate immune system.

The immune role of bitter receptors means that they are also found in other epithelial tissues besides the upper airway, for example breast tissue (mammary epithelial cells), gut lining and skin (keratinocytes). Additionally, while ligands of TAS2R may typically be bacterial markers, to defend against predators some plants produce the same substances, which are also interpreted by the tongue and the brain as being bitter. For example, TAS2R38 binds to acyl-homoserine lactones or quinolones produced by Pseudomonas aeruginosa, but also responds to bitter compounds in food.

Bitter molecules, their associated bitter taste receptors, and the sequences and homology models of bitter taste receptors, are available via BitterDB.

=== Not through taste receptors ===
These tastes are not mediated by the standard "taste receptors". A brief description of their molecular bases follows.

==== Sour ====
The diagram depicts the signal transduction pathway of the sour or salty taste. Object A is a taste bud, object B is a taste receptor cell within object A, and object C is the neuron attached to object B. I. Part I is the reception of hydrogen ions or sodium ions. 1. If the taste is sour, H+ ions, from an acidic substances, pass through their specific ion channel. Some can go through the Na+ channels. If the taste is salty Na+, sodium, molecules pass through the Na+ channels. Depolarization takes place II. Part II is the transduction pathway of the relay molecules.2. Cation, such as K+, channels are opened. III. Part III is the response of the cell. 3. An influx of Ca+ ions is activated.4. The Ca+ activates neurotransmitters. 5. A signal is sent to the neuron attached to the taste bud.

Historically it was thought that the sour taste was produced solely when free hydrogen ions (H^{+}) directly depolarised taste receptors. However, specific receptors for sour taste with other methods of action are now being proposed. The HCN channels were such a proposal; as they are cyclic nucleotide-gated channels. The two ion channels now suggested to contribute to sour taste are ASIC2 and TASK-1. OTOP1 is also thought to be a sour taste receptor.

==== Salt ====
Saltiness seems to have two components: a low-salt signal and a high-salt signal. The low-salt signal from epithelial sodium channel (ENaC), which detects sodium and similar ions, causes a sensation of deliciousness. The high-salt signal is known to correspond to a high chloride level and the sensation of "too salty", but the receptor has not yet been identified.

==== Carbonation ====
An enzyme connected to the sour receptor transmits information about carbonated water.

==== Fat ====
A possible taste receptor for fat, CD36, has been identified. CD36 has been localized to the circumvallate and foliate papillae, which are present in taste buds and where lingual lipase is produced, and research has shown that the CD36 receptor binds long chain fatty acids. Differences in the amount of CD36 expression in human subjects was associated with their ability to taste fats, creating a case for the receptor's relationship to fat tasting. Further research into the CD36 receptor could be useful in determining the existence of a true fat-tasting receptor.

Free fatty acid receptor 4 (also termed GPR120) and to a much lesser extent free fatty acid receptor 1 (also termed GPR40) have been implicated to respond to oral fat, and their absence leads to reduced fat preference and reduced neuronal response to orally administered fatty acids.

TRPM5 has been shown to be involved in oral fat response and identified as a possible oral fat receptor, but recent evidence presents it as primarily a downstream actor.

== Types ==
Human bitter taste receptor genes are named TAS2R1 to TAS2R64, with many gaps due to non-existent genes, pseudogenes or proposed genes that have not been annotated to the most recent human genome assembly. Many bitter taste receptor genes also have confusing synonym names with several different gene names referring to the same gene. See table below for full list of human bitter taste receptor genes:

Class	Gene	Synonyms	Aliases	Locus	Description	Notable ligands
type 1 (sweet)	TAS1R1		GPR70	1p36.23	TAS1R1/TAS1R3 heterodimers are the main umami taste receptor	Monosodium glutamate, Disodium guanylate, Inosine monophosphate, Guanosine monophosphate, Umami peptides (such as Beefy meaty peptide etc.)
type 1 (sweet)	TAS1R2		GPR71	1p36.23	TAS1R2/TAS1R3 heterodimers are the main sweet taste receptor	Sugars (Glucose, Sucrose, Fructose etc.), Aspartame, Carrelame, Cyclamate, Lugduname, Saccharin, Sucralose, Sucrononic acid, Sweet proteins (e.g. Brazzein, Curculin, Mabinlin, Monellin, Pentadin, Thaumatin etc.)
type 1 (sweet)	TAS1R3			1p36		Sugars (Glucose, Sucrose, Fructose etc.)
type 2 (bitter)	TAS2R1			5p15		
type 2 (bitter)	TAS2R2			7p21.3	pseudogene	
type 2 (bitter)	TAS2R3			7q31.3-q32		
type 2 (bitter)	TAS2R4			7q31.3-q32		Denatonium, Quinine
type 2 (bitter)	TAS2R5			7q31.3-q32		Quinine, Absinthin (selective)
type 2 (bitter)	TAS2R6			7	not annotated in human genome assembly	
type 2 (bitter)	TAS2R7			12p13		Chloroquine
type 2 (bitter)	TAS2R8			12p13		Denatonium
type 2 (bitter)	TAS2R9			12p13		Denatonium, Quinine
type 2 (bitter)	TAS2R10			12p13		
type 2 (bitter)	TAS2R11				absent in humans	
type 2 (bitter)	TAS2R12	TAS2R26		12p13.2	pseudogene	
type 2 (bitter)	TAS2R13			12p13		
type 2 (bitter)	TAS2R14			12p13		Flufenamic acid, TAS2R14 agonist 28.1 (selective)
type 2 (bitter)	TAS2R15			12p13.2	pseudogene	
type 2 (bitter)	TAS2R16			7q31.1-q31.3		Denatonium, Amygdalin, Arbutin, Sinigrin, Salicin (selective)
type 2 (bitter)	TAS2R17				absent in humans	
type 2 (bitter)	TAS2R18			12p13.2	pseudogene	
type 2 (bitter)	TAS2R19	TAS2R23, TAS2R48		12p13.2		
type 2 (bitter)	TAS2R20	TAS2R49		12p13.2		
type 2 (bitter)	TAS2R21				absent in humans	
type 2 (bitter)	TAS2R22			12	not annotated in human genome assembly	
type 2 (bitter)	TAS2R24				absent in humans	
type 2 (bitter)	TAS2R25				absent in humans	
type 2 (bitter)	TAS2R27				absent in humans	
type 2 (bitter)	TAS2R28				absent in humans	
type 2 (bitter)	TAS2R29				absent in humans	
type 2 (bitter)	TAS2R30	TAS2R47		12p13.2		
type 2 (bitter)	TAS2R31	TAS2R44		12p13.2		Acesulfame (in some individuals)
type 2 (bitter)	TAS2R32				absent in humans	
type 2 (bitter)	TAS2R33			12	not annotated in human genome assembly	
type 2 (bitter)	TAS2R34				absent in humans	
type 2 (bitter)	TAS2R35				absent in humans	
type 2 (bitter)	TAS2R36			12	not annotated in human genome assembly	
type 2 (bitter)	TAS2R37			12	not annotated in human genome assembly	
type 2 (bitter)	TAS2R38			7q34		Propylthiouracil, Phenylthiocarbamide, N-Acyl homoserine lactone
type 2 (bitter)	TAS2R39			7q34		Denatonium
type 2 (bitter)	TAS2R40		GPR60	7q34		
type 2 (bitter)	TAS2R41			7q34		
type 2 (bitter)	TAS2R42			12p13		
type 2 (bitter)	TAS2R43			12p13.2		Denatonium
type 2 (bitter)	TAS2R45		GPR59	12		
type 2 (bitter)	TAS2R46			12p13.2		Denatonium, Oligoporins A-C, Oligoporin D (selective)
type 2 (bitter)	TAS2R50	TAS2R51		12p13.2		Amarogentin (selective)
type 2 (bitter)	TAS2R52				absent in humans	
type 2 (bitter)	TAS2R53				absent in humans	
type 2 (bitter)	TAS2R54				absent in humans	
type 2 (bitter)	TAS2R55				absent in humans	
type 2 (bitter)	TAS2R56				absent in humans	
type 2 (bitter)	TAS2R57				absent in humans	
type 2 (bitter)	TAS2R58				absent in humans	
type 2 (bitter)	TAS2R59				absent in humans	
type 2 (bitter)	TAS2R60			7		
type 2 (bitter)	TAS2R62P			7q34	pseudogene	
type 2 (bitter)	TAS2R63P			12p13.2	pseudogene	
type 2 (bitter)	TAS2R64P			12p13.2	pseudogene	

== Evolution ==
The taste receptor families TAS1R and TAS2R are exclusively found in jawed vertebrates. The ancestral jawed vertebrate would, therefore, had both appetitive and aversive taste receptors.

- - 8
  - - 7
    - - 6
      - - 5
        - - 2A
          - - 2B
            - 1
- - 4
  - - 3C
    - - 3B
      - 3A

Schematic of TAS1R division

TAS1R has been broken down into 8 groups (1–8), with 2 further broken down into 2A–B, and 3 into 3A–C. By comparison of gene occurrence, the last jawed vertebrate common ancestor (LJVCA) probably had 3C, 4, 6, and 7. In bony vertebrates, 6 diverged into 1, 2, and 5; and 3C diverged into 3A and 3B. Humans have 1, 2A, and 3A. It has stayed as a gene cluster in most vertebrates. Most receptors of this group detect various amino acids (sometimes potentiated by ribonucleosides). The ability to detect sugars such as sucrose is likely a later innovation (see above). (Another scheme uses letters for groups beyond 1–3.)

The LJVCA likely had only one copy of TAS2R, which remains the situation in cartilaginous fish (CF) today (with the exception of those that has no TAS2R at all). Not much is known about its original target, however: out of 45 tested substances (most of which are known to activate bony vertebrate TAS2R), only 5 elicited a response in any of the 4 tested CF TAS2Rs. The three compounds that activated all tested CF receptors were synthetic: chloroquine diphosphate, denatonium benzoate, and ofloxacin. The remaining two natural substances, amarogentin and colchicine, only activated shark receptors. T2R can be divided into subclades A through E. T2R is closely related to V1R/ORA, though the precise circumstances of its genesis is unclear.

=== Loss of function ===
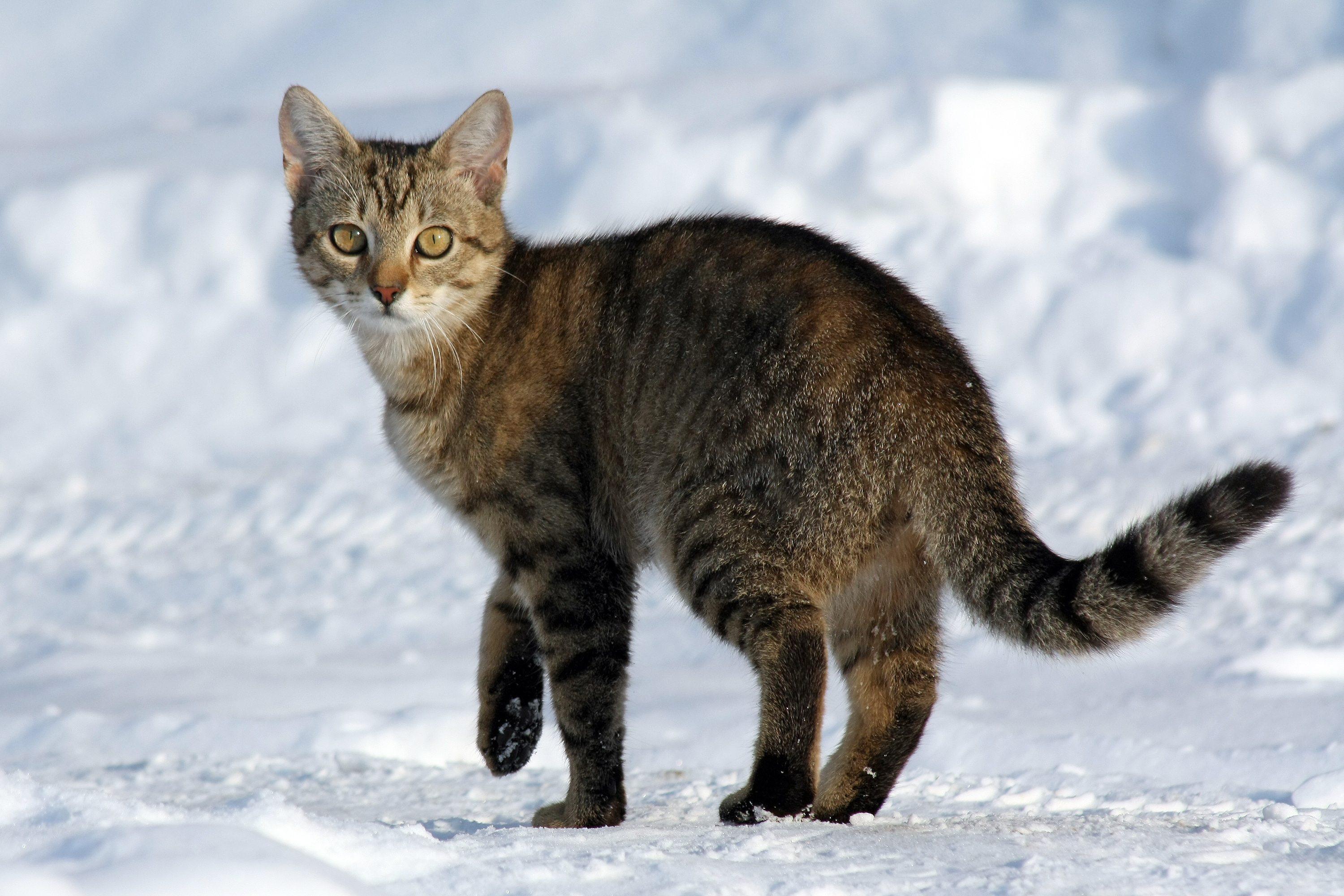
Felines have lost the ability to taste sweetness owing to their carnivorous diet

The TAS1R (T1R) genes have seen shifts in their functions in many lineages, occasionally amounting to the complete loss of a gene. These appetitive receptors decide what an animal likes. There is a correlation between inactivation of T1R genes and feeding behavior.

The T1R2/T1R3 taste receptor complex detects sweetness in mammals and lizards – presumably the ancestral state of tetrapods. Many Carnivoran mammals are unable to detect sweetness in food, including cats and vampire bats, due to the pseudogenization of T1R2. This pseudogenization is quite widespread in the order, having occurred independently in several lineages via different mutations to the same gene. This is an example of convergent evolution. Furthermore, pseudogenization of T1R2 are also known in chickens and the Western clawed frog.

The T1R1/T1R3 taste receptor complex detects umami in mammals. In two lineages of aquatic mammals including dolphins and sea lions, Tas1r1 has been found to be pseudogenized. The pseudogenization of Tas1r1 has also been found in terrestrial, carnivorous species. While the panda belongs to the order Carnivora, it is herbivorous where 99% of its diet is bamboo, and it cannot taste umami. Genome sequence of the panda shows that its Tas1r1 gene is pseudogenized. In a study, it was found that in all species in the order Carnivora except the panda, the open reading frame was maintained. In panda, the nonsynonymous to synonymous substitutions ratio was found to be much higher than other species in order Carnivora. This data correlates with fossil records date of the panda to show where panda switched from carnivore to herbivore diet. Therefore, the loss of function of umami in panda is hypothesized to be caused by dietary change where the panda became less dependence on meat. However, these studies do not explain herbivores such as horses and cows that have retained the Tas1r1 receptor.

Complete loss of T2R is known in some cartilaginous fishes and snakes.

Overall, the loss of function of a taste receptor is an evolutionary process that occurred with a dietary change in species.

== See also ==
List of distinct cell types in the adult human body
