= Amarogentin =

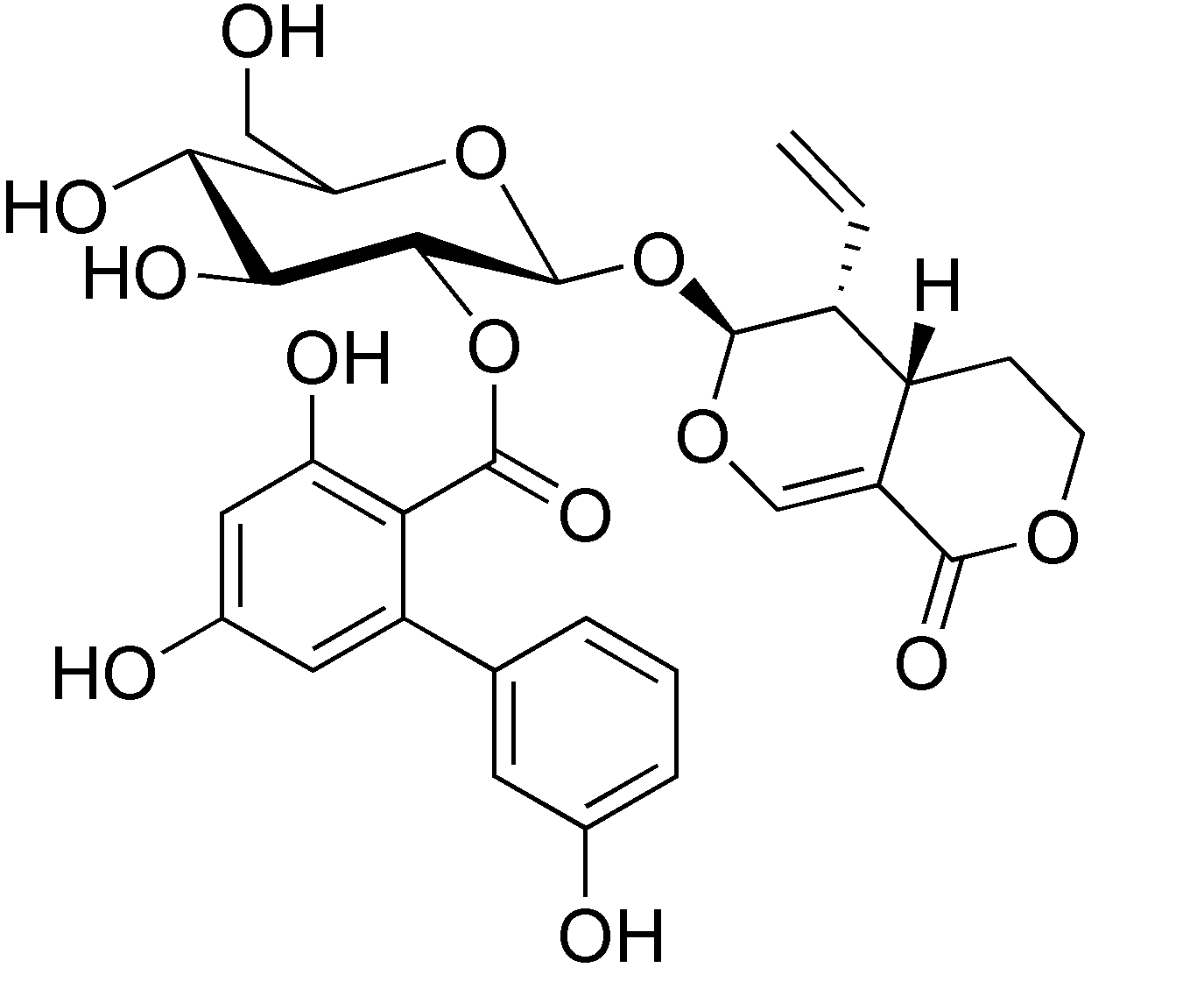
- Chemical structure of amarogentin Chemical structure of amarogentin

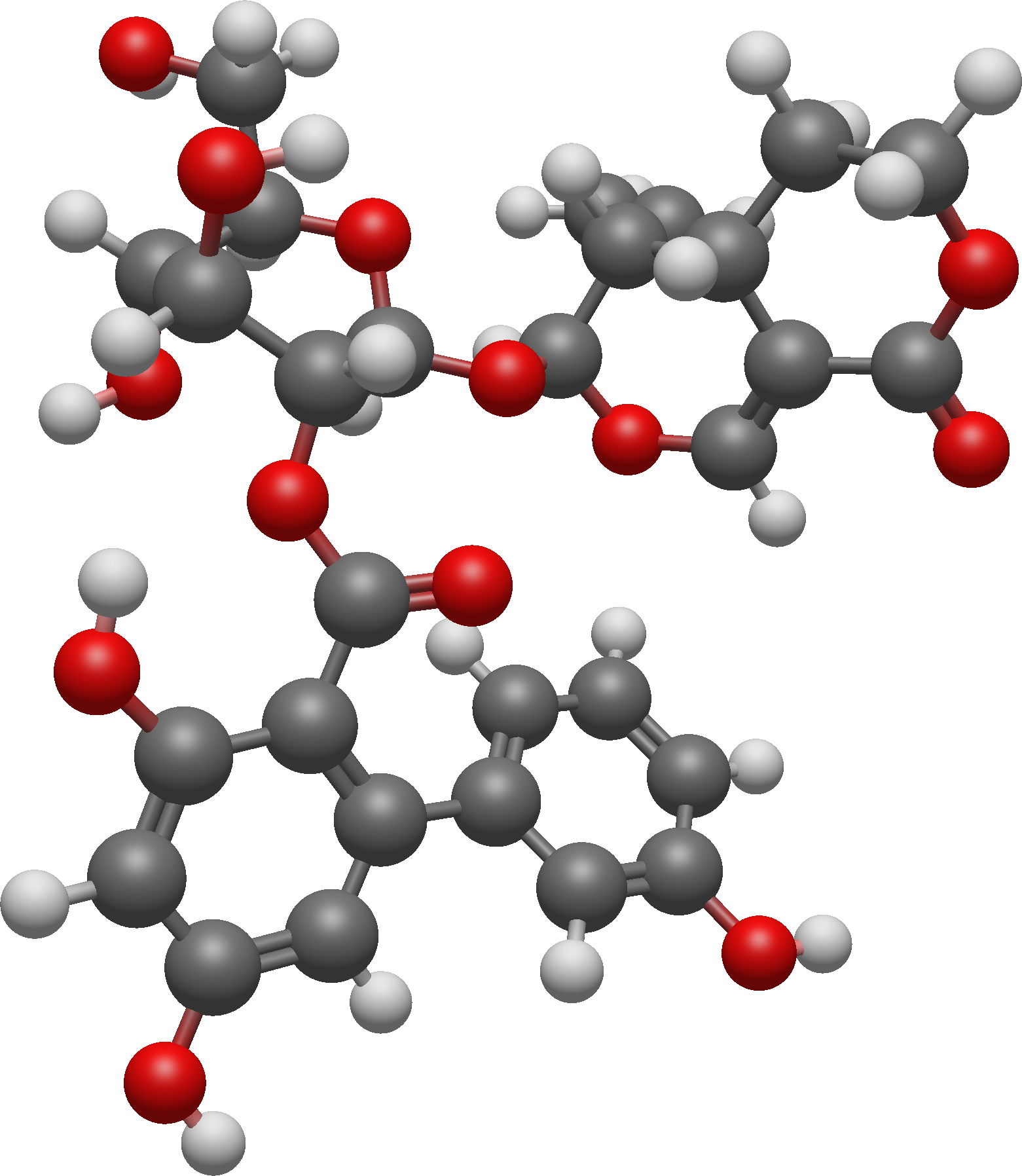
- Chemical structure of amarogentin Chemical structure of amarogentin

Names
- IUPAC name (4aS,5R,6S)-5-Ethenyl-1-oxo-4,4a,5,6-tetrahydro-1H,3H-pyrano[3,4-c]pyran-6-yl β-D-glucopyranoside 2-(3,3′,5-trihydroxy[1,1′-biphenyl]-2-carboxylate)
- Systematic IUPAC name (2S,3R,4S,5S,6R)-2-{[(4aS,5R,6S)-5-Ethenyl-1-oxo-4,4a,5,6-tetrahydro-1H,3H-pyrano[3,4-c]pyran-6-yl]oxy}-4,5-dihydroxy-6-(hydroxymethyl)oxan-3-yl 3,3′,5-trihydroxy[1,1′-biphenyl]-2-carboxylate

Identifiers
CAS Number	21018-84-8
3D model (JSmol)	Interactive image
ChEBI	CHEBI:2622
ChEMBL	ChEMBL451112
ChemSpider	103033
ECHA InfoCard	100.166.688
PubChem CID	115149
UNII	5L82GT5I0W
CompTox Dashboard (EPA)	DTXSID501029787
- InChI: InChI=1S/C29H30O13/c1-2-16-17-6-7-38-26(36)19(17)12-39-28(16)42-29-25(24(35)23(34)21(11-30)40-29)41-27(37)22-18(9-15(32)10-20(22)33)13-4-3-5-14(31)8-13/h2-5,8-10,12,16-17,21,23-25,28-35H,1,6-7,11H2/t16-,17+,21-,23-,24+,25-,28+,29+/m1/s1 Key: DBOVHQOUSDWAPQ-WTONXPSSSA-N; InChI=1/C29H30O13/c1-2-16-17-6-7-38-26(36)19(17)12-39-28(16)42-29-25(24(35)23(34)21(11-30)40-29)41-27(37)22-18(9-15(32)10-20(22)33)13-4-3-5-14(31)8-13/h2-5,8-10,12,16-17,21,23-25,28-35H,1,6-7,11H2/t16-,17+,21-,23-,24+,25-,28+,29+/m1/s1 Key: DBOVHQOUSDWAPQ-WTONXPSSBG
- SMILES: O=C/1OCC[C@@H]5C\1=C\O[C@@H](O[C@@H]4O[C@@H]([C@@H](O)[C@H](O)[C@H]4OC(=O)c3c(c2cccc(O)c2)cc(O)cc3O)CO)[C@@H]5\C=C

Properties
Chemical formula	C_{29}H_{30}O_{13}
Molar mass	586.546 g·mol^{−1}
- Except where otherwise noted, data are given for materials in their standard state (at 25 °C [77 °F], 100 kPa). verify (what is ?) Infobox references

Amarogentin is a chemical compound found in gentian 7 organisms, including: Swertia chirata (d),,,,, Gentiana lutea,,,, Gentiana purpurea, Gentianella nitida,, Swertia japonica,,,,,

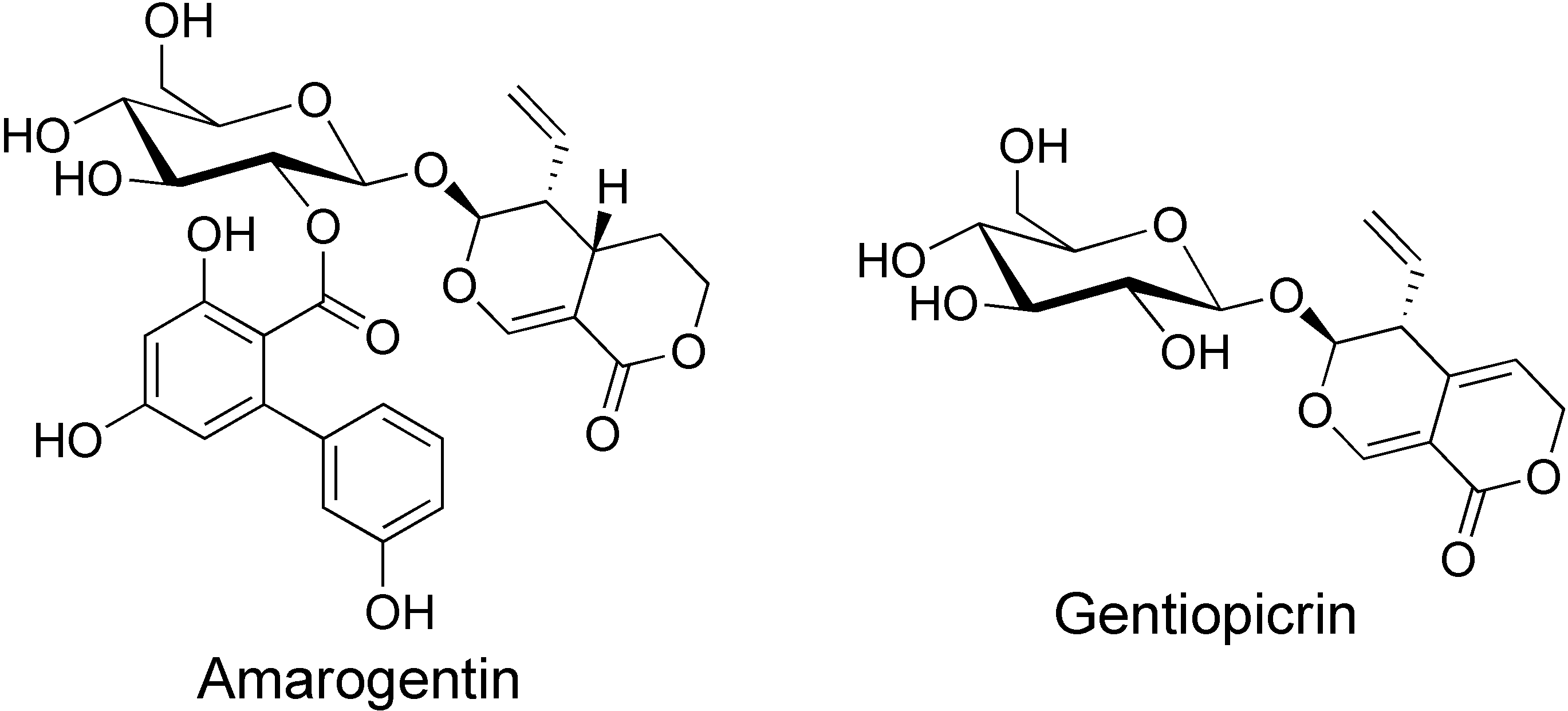
Amarogentin and gentiopicrin, the bitter glycosides from gentian root

Gentian root has a long history of use as a herbal bitter in the treatment of digestive disorders and is an ingredient of many proprietary medicines. The bitter principles of gentian root are secoiridoid glycosides amarogentin and gentiopicrin. The former is one of the most bitter natural compounds known and is used as a scientific basis for measuring bitterness. In humans, it activates the bitter taste receptor TAS2R50. The biphenylcarboxylic acid moiety is biosynthesized by a polyketide-type pathway, with three units of acetyl-CoA and one unit of 3-hydroxybenzoyl-CoA, this being formed from an early shikimate pathway intermediate and not via cinnamic or benzoic acid.

It also shows an antileishmanial activity in animal models being an inhibitor of topoisomerase I.

== See also ==
- Denatonium
- TAS2R14 agonist 28.1
- Oligoporin D
