= TAS2R4 =

Protein-coding gene in the species Homo sapiens

Identifiers
- Aliases: TAS2R4, T2R4, taste 2 receptor member 4
- External IDs: OMIM: 604869; MGI: 2681210; GeneCards: TAS2R4

Gene location (Human)
Chr.	Chromosome 7 (human)
Band	7q34	Start	141,776,674 bp
Band	7q34	End	141,781,691 bp

Gene location (Mouse)
Chr.	Chromosome 6 (mouse)
Band	6|6 B1	Start	40,470,463 bp
Band	6|6 B1	End	40,471,475 bp
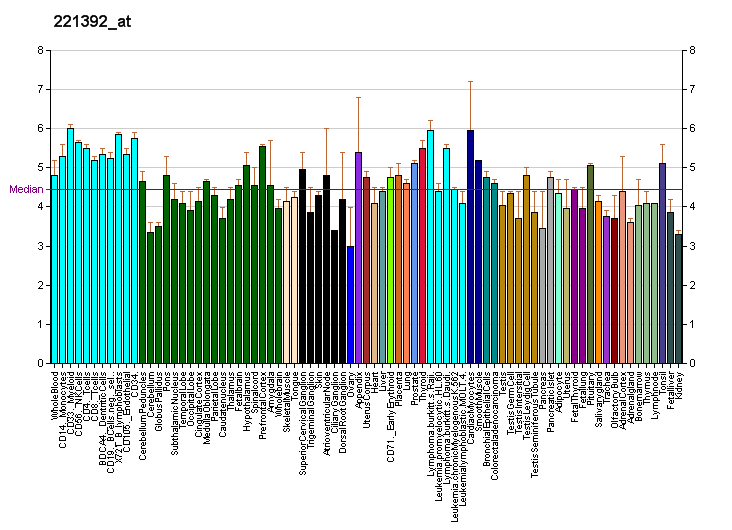
RNA expression pattern
Bgee	Human / Mouse (ortholog); Top expressed in: gonad; testicle; sural nerve; buccal mucosa cell; cerebellar hemisphere; right hemisphere of cerebellum; epithelium of colon; right uterine tube; nucleus accumbens; Brodmann area 9 / Top expressed in: embryo; zygote; More reference expression data
BioGPS	More reference expression data
Gene ontology
Molecular function	G protein-coupled receptor activity; taste receptor activity; bitter taste receptor activity; signal transducer activity
Cellular component	plasma membrane; cell projection; cilium; ciliary membrane; membrane; integral component of membrane
Biological process	response to stimulus; detection of chemical stimulus involved in sensory perception of bitter taste; sensory perception of taste; respiratory gaseous exchange by respiratory system; signal transduction; G protein-coupled receptor signaling pathway
Sources:Amigo / QuickGO
Orthologs
Databases	NCBI: entry; OMA: entry
Species	Human	Mouse
Entrez	50832	57253
Ensembl	ENSG00000127364	ENSMUSG00000037140
UniProt	Q9NYW5	Q9JKT3
RefSeq (mRNA)	NM_016944	NM_020502
RefSeq (protein)	NP_058640	NP_065248
Location (UCSC)	Chr 7: 141.78 – 141.78 Mb	Chr 6: 40.47 – 40.47 Mb
PubMed search
- Wikidata
View/Edit Human	View/Edit Mouse

Taste receptor type 2 member 4 is a protein that in humans is encoded by the TAS2R4 gene.

== Function ==
This gene encodes a member of a family of candidate taste receptors that are members of the G protein-coupled receptor superfamily and that are specifically expressed by taste receptor cells of the tongue and palate epithelia. These apparently intronless genes encode a 7-transmembrane receptor protein, functioning as a bitter taste receptor. This gene is clustered with another 3 candidate taste receptor genes in chromosome 7 and is genetically linked to loci that influence bitter perception. The geographic distribution of TAS2R4 and TAS2R5 missense allele variants which prevent expression of the receptors is aligned with the distributions of tannin sorghum and the destructive agricultural bird pest in Africa, indicating the role of human taste in developing agroecosystems fitting local environments.

== Ligands ==
Ligands listed in BitterDB include quinine, parthenolide, denatonium, some non-sugar sweeteners including sucralose and stevioside, and several oligopeptides.

== See also ==
- Taste receptor
