= TAS2R1 =

Member of the 25 known human bitter taste receptors

Identifiers
- Aliases: TAS2R1, T2R1, TRB7, taste 2 receptor member 1
- External IDs: OMIM: 604796; MGI: 2681253; GeneCards: TAS2R1

Gene location (Human)
Chr.	Chromosome 5 (human)
Band	5p15.31	Start	9,627,347 bp
Band	5p15.31	End	9,712,378 bp

Gene location (Mouse)
Chr.	Chromosome 15 (mouse)
Band	15|15 B3.1	Start	32,177,435 bp
Band	15|15 B3.1	End	32,178,440 bp
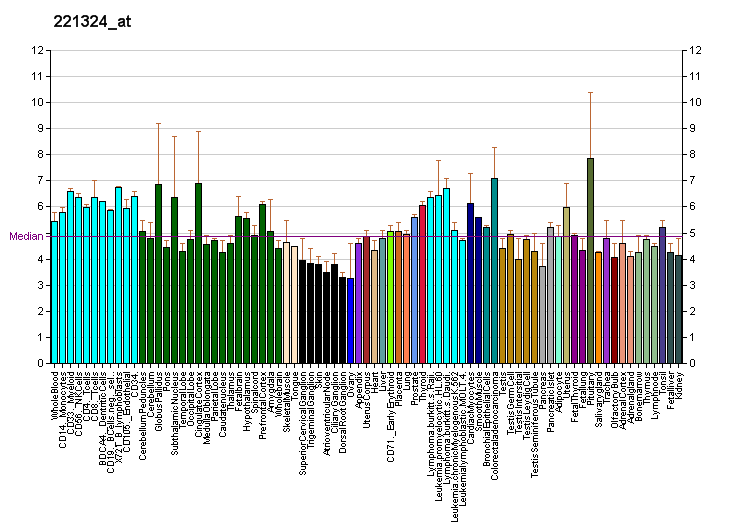
RNA expression pattern
Bgee	Human / Mouse (ortholog); Top expressed in: right testis; left testis; stromal cell of endometrium; epithelium of colon; placenta; caudate nucleus; putamen; nucleus accumbens; hippocampal formation; prefrontal cortex / Top expressed in: proximal tubule; right kidney; genital tubercle; More reference expression data
BioGPS	More reference expression data
Gene ontology
Molecular function	G protein-coupled receptor activity; signal transducer activity; taste receptor activity; bitter taste receptor activity
Cellular component	plasma membrane; membrane; integral component of membrane
Biological process	G protein-coupled receptor signaling pathway; detection of chemical stimulus involved in sensory perception of bitter taste; signal transduction; response to stimulus; sensory perception of taste
Sources:Amigo / QuickGO
Orthologs
Databases	NCBI: entry; OMA: entry
Species	Human	Mouse
Entrez	50834	57254
Ensembl	ENSG00000169777	ENSMUSG00000045267
UniProt	Q9NYW7	Q9JKT2
RefSeq (mRNA)	NM_019599; NM_001386348	NM_020503
RefSeq (protein)	NP_062545	NP_065249
Location (UCSC)	Chr 5: 9.63 – 9.71 Mb	Chr 15: 32.18 – 32.18 Mb
PubMed search
- Wikidata
View/Edit Human	View/Edit Mouse

Taste receptor type 2 member 1 (TAS2R1/T2R1) is a protein that in humans is encoded by the TAS2R1 gene. It belongs to the G protein-coupled receptor (GPCR) family and is related to class A-like GPCRs, they contain 7 transmembrane helix bundles and short N-terminus loop. Furthermore, TAS2R1 is member of the 25 known human bitter taste receptors, which enable the perception of bitter taste in the mouth cavity. Increasing evidence indicates a functional role of TAS2Rs in extra-oral tissues.

== Expression and function ==
=== Extra-oral roles of TAS2Rs ===
Bitter taste receptors are expressed in taste receptor cells, which organized into taste buds on the papillae of the tongue and palate epithelium.

In addition, TAS2Rs were found to be expressed in extra-oral tissues, e.g. brain, lungs, gastrointestinal tract, etc. So far, less is known about their function however, for example it was shown that:

- TAS2Rs mediate relaxation of airway smooth muscles.
- TAS2R43 is involved in secretion of gastric acid in the stomach.

=== Extra-oral roles of TAS2R1 ===
- TAS2R1, TAS2R4, TAS2R10, TAS2R38 and TAS2R49 were found to be down-regulated in breast cancer cells.
- TAS2R1, causes vasoconstrictor responses in the pulmonary circuit and relaxation in the airways.

== Structure of TAS2R1 receptor ==
Based on a recent homology model from BitterDB several conserved motifs, which are counterparts to Class A GPCRs were found:

- Transmembrane helix 1: N^{1.50}xxI^{1.53}
- Transmembrane helix 2: L^{2.46}xxxR^{2.50}
- Transmembrane helix 3: F^{3.49}Y^{3.50}xxK^{3.53}
- Transmembrane helix 5: P^{5.50}
- Transmembrane helix 6: F^{6.44}xxxY^{6.46}
- Transmembrane helix 7: H^{7.49}S^{7.50}xxL^{7.53}

Numbering is according to the Balleros-Weinstein system

Unlike in Class A GPCRs, in transmembrane helix 4 no DRY motif was found as well as position 6.50 is not conserved.

== Gene ==
This gene encodes a member of a family of candidate taste receptors that are members of the G protein-coupled receptor superfamily and that are specifically expressed by taste receptor cells of the tongue and palate epithelia. This intronless taste receptor gene encodes a 7-transmembrane receptor protein, functioning as a bitter taste receptor.

=== SNPs ===
In T2R1 two SNPs are known in R111H and R206W (dbSNP).

=== Transcription factors ===
So far, AML1a, AP-1, AREB6, FOXL1, IRF-7A, Lmo2, NF-E2, NF-E2 p45 were found as the top transcription factor binding sites by QIAGEN in the TAS2R1 gene promoter.

=== Mutagenesis data ===
Several mutations have been shown to influence binding of a ligand to TAS2R1 (based on BitterDB):

Receptor region	BW number	Residue	Reference
TM1	1.5	N24	
TM1	1.53	I27	
TM2	2.5	R55	
TM2	2.56	F61	
TM2	2.61	N66	
ECL1		E74	
TM3	3.32	L85	
TM3	3.33	L86	
TM3	3.36	N89	
TM3	3.37	E90	
TM3	3.41	W94	
TM3	3.46	L99	
TM5	5.46	E182	
TM5	5.61	L197	
TM5	5.64	S200	
TM5	5.65	L201	
TM7	7.39	I263	
TM7	7.49	H273	
TM7	7.53	L277	
TM7	7.54	I278	

== Ligands ==
Up to now, 39 ligands for T2R1 were identified in BitterDB, among them L-amino acids, peptides, humulones, small molecules etc.

== See also ==
- Taste receptor
