= TAS2R14 =

Protein-coding gene in the species Homo sapiens

Identifiers
- Aliases: TAS2R14, T2R14, TRB1, taste 2 receptor member 14
- External IDs: OMIM: 604790; MGI: 2681298; GeneCards: TAS2R14

Gene location (Human)
| Chr. | Chromosome 12 (human) |
| Band | 12p13.2 | Start | 10,937,408 bp |
| Band | 12p13.2 | End | 11,171,573 bp |

Gene location (Mouse)
| Chr. | Chromosome 6 (mouse) |
| Band | 6 G1|6 64.03 cM | Start | 133,031,780 bp |
| Band | 6 G1|6 64.03 cM | End | 133,032,779 bp |
RNA expression pattern
| Bgee | Human / Mouse (ortholog); Top expressed in: testicle; corpus callosum; cerebellar hemisphere; right hemisphere of cerebellum; right ovary; C1 segment; left ovary; endometrium; gastric mucosa; body of uterus / Top expressed in: spermatid; More reference expression data |
| BioGPS | n/a |
Gene ontology
| Molecular function | G protein-coupled receptor activity; signal transducer activity; taste receptor activity; bitter taste receptor activity |
| Cellular component | plasma membrane; membrane; integral component of membrane |
| Biological process | detection of chemical stimulus involved in sensory perception of bitter taste; signal transduction; response to stimulus; sensory perception of taste; G protein-coupled receptor signaling pathway |
Sources:Amigo / QuickGO
Orthologs
| Databases | NCBI: entry; OMA: entry |
| Species | Human | Mouse |
| Entrez | 50840 | 387616 |
| Ensembl | ENSG00000212127; ENSG00000261984; ENSG00000276541 | ENSMUSG00000071147 |
| UniProt | Q9NYV8 | Q7TQA4 |
| RefSeq (mRNA) | NM_023922 | NM_021562 |
| RefSeq (protein) | NP_076411 | NP_067537 |
| Location (UCSC) | Chr 12: 10.94 – 11.17 Mb | Chr 6: 133.03 – 133.03 Mb |
| PubMed search |
- Wikidata
| View/Edit Human | View/Edit Mouse |

Taste receptor type 2 member 14 is a protein that in humans is encoded by the TAS2R14 gene.

Taste receptors for bitter substances (T2Rs/TAS2Rs) belong to the family of G-protein coupled receptors and are related to class A-like GPCRs. There are 25 known T2Rs in humans responsible for bitter taste perception.

Bitter taste receptor hTAS2R14 is one of the human bitter taste receptors, recognizing an enormous variety of structurally different molecules, including natural and synthetic bitter compounds.

== Gene ==
TAS2R14 gene (Taste receptor type 2 member 14) is a Protein Coding gene. This gene maps to the taste receptor gene cluster on chromosome 12p13.

An important paralog of this gene is TAS2R13.

== SNPs ==
Taste receptors harbor many polymorphisms, and several SNPs have a profound impact on the gene function and expression.

Common TAS2R14 SNPs location
| Mutation | dbSNP |
|---|---|
| I5M | rs79297986 |
| F63L | rs142263768 |
| C67S | rs140545738 |
| T86A | rs16925868 |
| N87Y | rs146833217 |
| I118V | rs4140968 |
| F198L | rs202123922 |
| L201F | rs35804287 |
| K211R | rs111614880 |

Data obtained from 1000 genomes project.

== Site-directed mutagenesis ==
The following residues have been subjected to site-directed mutagenesis.

| Location | BW number | Residue |
| TM2 | 2.61 | W66 |
| ECL1 | 3.28 | L85 |
| ECL1 | 3.29 | T86 |
| ECL1 | 3.3 | N87 |
| TM3 | 3.32 | W89 |
| TM3 | 3.33 | T90 |
| TM3 | 3.36 | N93 |
| TM3 | 3.37 | H94 |
| ECL2 | 5.42 | T182 |
| ECL2 | 5.43 | S183 |
| TM5 | 5.46 | F186 |
| TM5 | 5.47 | I187 |
| TM6 | 6.48 | Y240 |
| TM6 | 6.49 | A241 |
| TM6 | 6.51 | F243 |
| TM6 | 6.55 | F247 |
| TM7 | 7.36 | I263 |
| TM7 | 7.39 | Q266 |
| TM7 | 7.42 | G269 |

== Signal transduction pathways ==
TAS2Rs activation produces modulation of a broad range of signal transduction pathways. The Gαgusducin (Gαgus), which belongs to the Gαi subfamily, was first identified and cloned in 1992 in taste tissue, and has high similarity to the Gα-transducin (Gαtrans) in the retina. Gα16gus44, a chimeric Gα16 (type of Gαq), harboring 44 gustducin specific sequence at its C terminus, or Gαqi5, a Gαq protein containing the five carboxyl-terminal amino acids from Gαi, are often used in order to couple the taste receptor to Gαq pathway and measure calcium or IP3 release. Specifically, stimulation of a GPCR receptor, coupled to Gαq, results in the activation of phospholipase C β2 (PLC), which then stimulates the second messengers 1,4,5-inositol trisphosphate (IP3) and diacylglycerol (DAG). IP3 causes the release of Ca+2 from intracellular stores. Calcium opens Ca-activated TRP ion channels and leads to depolarization of the cell as well as to release of neurotransmitters.

== Ligands ==
To date, 151 ligands have been identified for T2R14, in addition to 12 synthetic flufenamic acid derivatives. TAS2R14 agonist 28.1 is one of the most potent agonists yet developed for this target.

== Tissue distribution ==
In addition to the tongue, TAS2R14 is expressed in many other tissues including the heart, thyroid, stomach, skin, urogenital, immune system, and more.

== Function ==
This gene product belongs to the family of taste receptors that are members of the G-protein-coupled receptor superfamily. These proteins are specifically expressed in the taste receptor cells of the tongue and palate epithelia. They are organized in the genome in clusters and are genetically linked to loci that influence bitter perception in mice and humans. In functional expression studies, TAS2R14 responds to (−)-α-thujone, the primary neurotoxic agent in absinthe, and picrotoxin, a poison found in fishberries. This gene maps to the taste receptor gene cluster on chromosome 12p13.

TAS2R14 is also expressed in the smooth muscle of human airways, along with several other bitter taste receptors. Their activation in these cells causes an increase in intracellular calcium ion, which in turn triggers the opening of potassium channels which hyperpolarize the membrane and cause the smooth muscle to relax. Hence, activation of these receptors leads to bronchodilation.

In the respiratory system, several TAS2R subtypes: TAS2R4, TAS2R16, TAS2R14 and TAS2R38, were found to play important roles in innate immune nitric oxide production (NO).

T2R14 causes inhibition of IgE-dependent mast cells.

Associations between single nucleotide polymorphisms in TAS214 gene and male infertility were observed.

== See also ==
- Taste receptor
