= TAS2R3 =

Protein-coding gene in the species Homo sapiens

Identifiers
- Aliases: TAS2R3, T2R3, taste 2 receptor member 3
- External IDs: OMIM: 604868; MGI: 3606604; GeneCards: TAS2R3

Gene location (Human)
Chr.	Chromosome 7 (human)
Band	7q34	Start	141,764,097 bp
Band	7q34	End	141,765,197 bp

Gene location (Mouse)
Chr.	Chromosome 6 (mouse)
Band	6|6 B1	Start	40,468,167 bp
Band	6|6 B1	End	40,469,239 bp
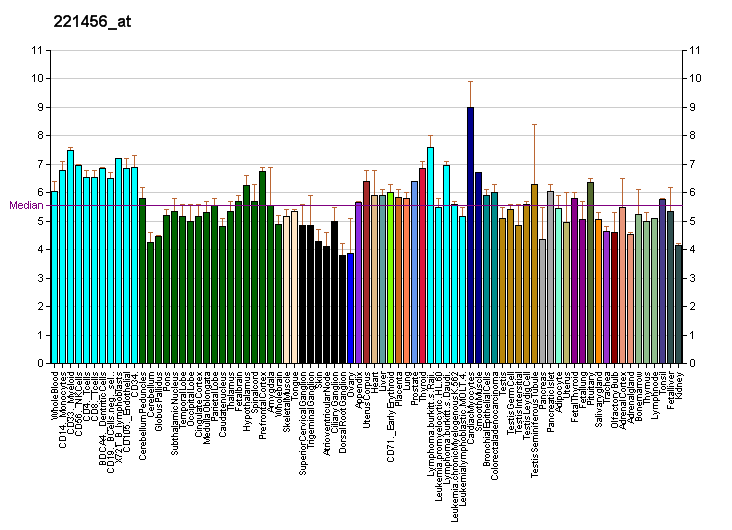
RNA expression pattern
Bgee	Human / Mouse (ortholog); Top expressed in: corpus callosum; epithelium of colon; Achilles tendon; tonsil; right hemisphere of cerebellum; right uterine tube; urinary bladder; ovary; body of uterus; muscle of thigh / Top expressed in: embryo; primary oocyte; zygote; More reference expression data
BioGPS	More reference expression data
Gene ontology
Molecular function	G protein-coupled receptor activity; signal transducer activity; taste receptor activity; bitter taste receptor activity
Cellular component	plasma membrane; membrane; integral component of membrane
Biological process	detection of chemical stimulus involved in sensory perception of bitter taste; sensory perception of taste; signal transduction; response to stimulus; G protein-coupled receptor signaling pathway
Sources:Amigo / QuickGO
Orthologs
Databases	NCBI: entry; OMA: entry
Species	Human	Mouse
Entrez	50831	574417
Ensembl	ENSG00000127362	ENSMUSG00000052850
UniProt	Q9NYW6	Q7TQA7
RefSeq (mRNA)	NM_016943	NM_001025385
RefSeq (protein)	NP_058639	NP_001020556
Location (UCSC)	Chr 7: 141.76 – 141.77 Mb	Chr 6: 40.47 – 40.47 Mb
PubMed search
- Wikidata
View/Edit Human	View/Edit Mouse

Taste receptor type 2 member 3 is a protein that in humans is encoded by the TAS2R3 gene.

== Function ==
This gene encodes a member of a family of candidate taste receptors that are members of the G protein-coupled receptor superfamily and that are specifically expressed by taste receptor cells of the tongue and palate epithelia. These apparently intronless taste receptor genes encode a 7-transmembrane receptor protein, functioning as a bitter taste receptor. This gene is clustered with another 3 candidate taste receptor genes in chromosome 7 and is genetically linked to loci that influence bitter perception.

== Ligands ==
The only known ligand for TAS2R3 in BitterDB is chloroquine.

== See also ==
- Taste receptor
