= TAS2R20 =

Protein-coding gene in the species Homo sapiens

Identifiers
- Aliases: TAS2R20, T2R20, T2R49, T2R56, TAS2R49, taste 2 receptor member 20
- External IDs: OMIM: 613962; MGI: 2681304; GeneCards: TAS2R20

Gene location (Human)
Chr.	Chromosome 12 (human)
Band	12p13.2	Start	10,995,961 bp
Band	12p13.2	End	10,998,304 bp

Gene location (Mouse)
Chr.	Chromosome 6 (mouse)
Band	6 G1|6 64.03 cM	Start	132,754,142 bp
Band	6 G1|6 64.03 cM	End	132,755,125 bp
RNA expression pattern
Bgee	Human / Mouse (ortholog); Top expressed in: corpus callosum; Achilles tendon; right ovary; left ovary; tibial nerve; skeletal muscle tissue; endometrium; gastrocnemius muscle; body of uterus; stromal cell of endometrium / n/a; More reference expression data
BioGPS	n/a
Gene ontology
Molecular function	G protein-coupled receptor activity; signal transducer activity; bitter taste receptor activity
Cellular component	plasma membrane; membrane; integral component of membrane
Biological process	sensory perception of taste; signal transduction; response to stimulus; detection of chemical stimulus involved in sensory perception of bitter taste; G protein-coupled receptor signaling pathway
Sources:Amigo / QuickGO
Orthologs
Databases	NCBI: entry; OMA: entry
Species	Human	Mouse
Entrez	259295	353165
Ensembl	ENSG00000282612; ENSG00000255837; ENSG00000273092	ENSMUSG00000053217
UniProt	P59543	Q7TQA8
RefSeq (mRNA)	NM_176889	NM_181276
RefSeq (protein)	NP_795370	NP_851793
Location (UCSC)	Chr 12: 11 – 11 Mb	Chr 6: 132.75 – 132.76 Mb
PubMed search
- Wikidata
View/Edit Human	View/Edit Mouse

Taste receptor type 2 member 20 is a protein that in humans is encoded by the TAS2R20 gene.

== See also ==
- Taste receptor
