= TAS2R60 =

Protein-coding gene in the species Homo sapiens

Identifiers
- Aliases: TAS2R60, T2R56, T2R60, taste 2 receptor member 60
- External IDs: OMIM: 613968; MGI: 2681302; GeneCards: TAS2R60

Gene location (Human)
Chr.	Chromosome 7 (human)
Band	7q35	Start	143,443,453 bp
Band	7q35	End	143,444,409 bp

Gene location (Mouse)
Chr.	Chromosome 6 (mouse)
Band	6|6 B2.1	Start	42,382,368 bp
Band	6|6 B2.1	End	42,383,460 bp
RNA expression pattern
Bgee	Human / Mouse (ortholog); Top expressed in: gonad; mucosa of large intestine; mucosa of transverse colon; blood; cell; white blood cell; monocyte; appendix; liver; placenta / Top expressed in: embryo; granulocyte; cerebellar cortex; More reference expression data
BioGPS	n/a
Gene ontology
Molecular function	G protein-coupled receptor activity; signal transducer activity; bitter taste receptor activity
Cellular component	integral component of membrane; plasma membrane; membrane
Biological process	sensory perception of bitter taste; detection of chemical stimulus involved in sensory perception of bitter taste; signal transduction; response to stimulus; sensory perception of taste; G protein-coupled receptor signaling pathway
Sources:Amigo / QuickGO
Orthologs
Databases	NCBI: entry; OMA: entry
Species	Human	Mouse
Entrez	338398	387512
Ensembl	ENSG00000185899; ENSG00000285341	ENSMUSG00000056203
UniProt	P59551	Q7TQA9
RefSeq (mRNA)	NM_177437	NM_199159
RefSeq (protein)	NP_803186	NP_954610
Location (UCSC)	Chr 7: 143.44 – 143.44 Mb	Chr 6: 42.38 – 42.38 Mb
PubMed search
- Wikidata
View/Edit Human	View/Edit Mouse

Taste receptor type 2 member 60 is a protein that in humans is encoded by the TAS2R60 gene.

== See also ==
- Taste receptor
