= TAS2R7 =

Protein-coding gene in the species Homo sapiens

Identifiers
- Aliases: TAS2R7, T2R7, TRB4, taste 2 receptor member 7
- External IDs: OMIM: 604793; MGI: 2681278; GeneCards: TAS2R7

Gene location (Human)
Chr.	Chromosome 12 (human)
Band	12p13.2	Start	10,801,532 bp
Band	12p13.2	End	10,802,627 bp

Gene location (Mouse)
Chr.	Chromosome 6 (mouse)
Band	6 F3|6 63.44 cM	Start	131,606,786 bp
Band	6 F3|6 63.44 cM	End	131,607,875 bp
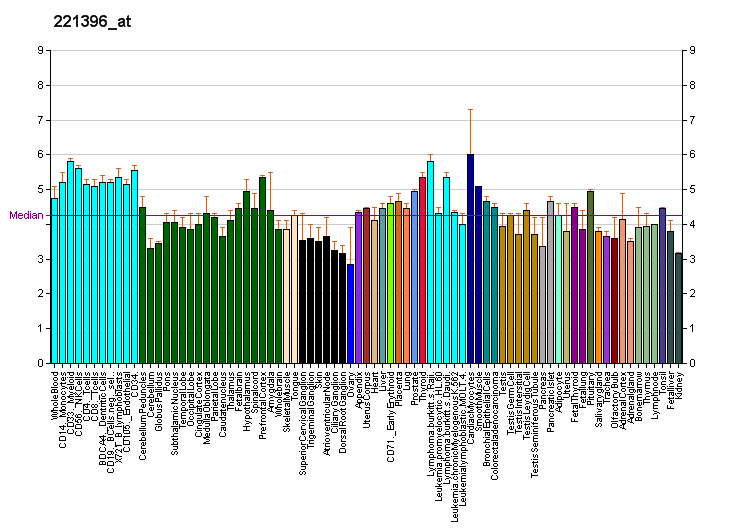
RNA expression pattern
Bgee	Human / Mouse (ortholog); Top expressed in: Achilles tendon / n/a; More reference expression data
BioGPS	More reference expression data
Gene ontology
Molecular function	G protein-coupled receptor activity; signal transducer activity; taste receptor activity; bitter taste receptor activity
Cellular component	plasma membrane; membrane; integral component of membrane
Biological process	detection of chemical stimulus involved in sensory perception of bitter taste; signal transduction; response to stimulus; sensory perception of taste; G protein-coupled receptor signaling pathway
Sources:Amigo / QuickGO
Orthologs
Databases	NCBI: entry; OMA: entry
Species	Human	Mouse
Entrez	50837	387355
Ensembl	ENSG00000121377; ENSG00000273326; ENSG00000274327	ENSMUSG00000054497
UniProt	Q9NYW3	P59530
RefSeq (mRNA)	NM_023919	NM_199156
RefSeq (protein)	NP_076408	NP_954607
Location (UCSC)	Chr 12: 10.8 – 10.8 Mb	Chr 6: 131.61 – 131.61 Mb
PubMed search
- Wikidata
View/Edit Human	View/Edit Mouse

Taste receptor type 2 member 7 is a protein that in humans is encoded by the TAS2R7 gene.

== Function ==
This gene product belongs to the family of candidate taste receptors that are members of the G-protein-coupled receptor superfamily. These proteins are specifically expressed in the taste receptor cells of the tongue and palate epithelia. They are organized in the genome in clusters and are genetically linked to loci that influence bitter perception in mice and humans. In functional expression studies, they respond to bitter tastants. This gene maps to the taste receptor gene cluster on chromosome 12p13.

== See also ==
- Taste receptor
