= TAS2R9 =

Protein-coding gene in the species Homo sapiens

Identifiers
- Aliases: TAS2R9, T2R9, TRB6, taste 2 receptor member 9
- External IDs: OMIM: 604795; GeneCards: TAS2R9

Gene location (Human)
Chr.	Chromosome 12 (human)
Band	12p13.2	Start	10,809,094 bp
Band	12p13.2	End	10,810,168 bp
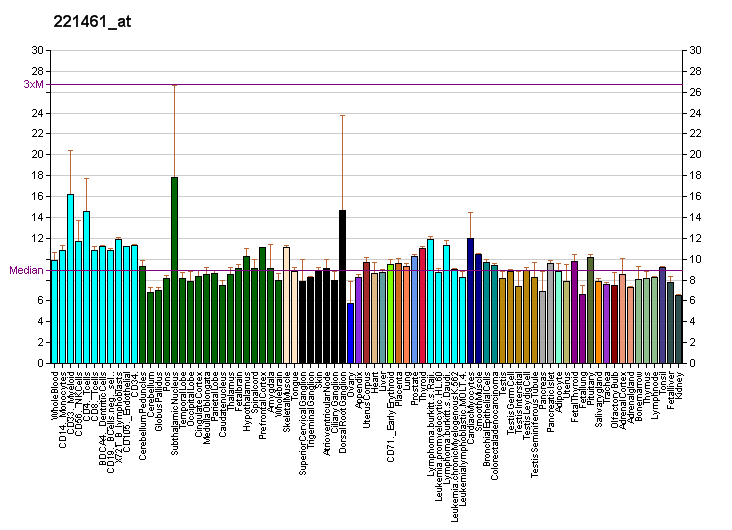
RNA expression pattern
Bgee	Human / Mouse (ortholog); Top expressed in: gonad; cell; monocyte; endometrium / n/a; More reference expression data
BioGPS	More reference expression data
Gene ontology
Molecular function	G protein-coupled receptor activity; signal transducer activity; taste receptor activity; bitter taste receptor activity
Cellular component	plasma membrane; membrane; integral component of membrane
Biological process	signal transduction; response to stimulus; sensory perception of taste; detection of chemical stimulus involved in sensory perception of bitter taste; G protein-coupled receptor signaling pathway; biological process
Sources:Amigo / QuickGO
Orthologs
Databases	NCBI: entry; OMA: entry
Species	Human	Mouse
Entrez	50835	n/a
Ensembl	ENSG00000273713; ENSG00000273086; ENSG00000121381	n/a
UniProt	Q9NYW1	n/a
RefSeq (mRNA)	NM_023917	n/a
RefSeq (protein)	NP_076406	n/a
Location (UCSC)	Chr 12: 10.81 – 10.81 Mb	n/a
PubMed search		n/a
- Wikidata
View/Edit Human

Taste receptor type 2 member 9 is a protein that in humans is encoded by the TAS2R9 gene.

== Function ==
This gene product belongs to the family of candidate taste receptors that are members of the G-protein-coupled receptor superfamily. These proteins are specifically expressed in the taste receptor cells of the tongue and palate epithelia. They are organized in the genome in clusters and are genetically linked to loci that influence bitter perception in mice and humans. In functional expression studies, they respond to bitter tastants. This gene maps to the taste receptor gene cluster on chromosome 12p13.

Polymorphisms in this gene have been associated with the perceived bitterness of sweetener acesulfame potassium.

== See also ==
- Taste receptor
