= TAS2R12P =

Pseudogene in the species Homo sapiens

Identifiers
- Aliases: TAS2R12P, PS10, T2R12, TAS2R12, TAS2R26, taste 2 receptor member 12 pseudogene
- External IDs: GeneCards: TAS2R12P
Orthologs
Databases	NCBI: entry
Species	Human	Mouse
Entrez	266656	n/a
Ensembl	n/a	n/a
UniProt	n a	n/a
RefSeq (mRNA)	n/a	n/a
RefSeq (protein)	n/a	n/a
Location (UCSC)	n/a	n/a
PubMed search		n/a
- Wikidata
View/Edit Human

Taste 2 receptor member 12 is a pseudogene that in humans is encoded by the TAS2R12P gene.

== See also ==
- Taste receptor
