= TAS2R41 =

Protein-coding gene in the species Homo sapiens

Identifiers
- Aliases: TAS2R41, T2R41, T2R59, taste 2 receptor member 41
- External IDs: OMIM: 613965; MGI: 2681273; GeneCards: TAS2R41

Gene location (Human)
Chr.	Chromosome 7 (human)
Band	7q35	Start	143,477,873 bp
Band	7q35	End	143,478,796 bp

Gene location (Mouse)
Chr.	Chromosome 6 (mouse)
Band	6|6 B2.1	Start	42,411,469 bp
Band	6|6 B2.1	End	42,412,398 bp
RNA expression pattern
Bgee	Human / Mouse (ortholog); Top expressed in: muscle of thigh / Top expressed in: embryo; More reference expression data
BioGPS	n/a
Gene ontology
Molecular function	G protein-coupled receptor activity; signal transducer activity; bitter taste receptor activity
Cellular component	integral component of membrane; plasma membrane; membrane
Biological process	detection of chemical stimulus involved in sensory perception of bitter taste; signal transduction; response to stimulus; sensory perception of taste; G protein-coupled receptor signaling pathway
Sources:Amigo / QuickGO
Orthologs
Databases	NCBI: entry; OMA: entry
Species	Human	Mouse
Entrez	259287	387353
Ensembl	ENSG00000221855; ENSG00000284982	ENSMUSG00000048284
UniProt	P59536	P59532
RefSeq (mRNA)	NM_176883	NM_207028
RefSeq (protein)	NP_795364	NP_996911
Location (UCSC)	Chr 7: 143.48 – 143.48 Mb	Chr 6: 42.41 – 42.41 Mb
PubMed search
- Wikidata
View/Edit Human	View/Edit Mouse

Taste receptor type 2 member 41 is a protein that in humans is encoded by the TAS2R41 gene.

== See also ==
- Taste receptor
