= TAS2R45 =

Protein-coding gene in the species Homo sapiens

Identifiers
- Aliases: TAS2R45, GPR59, T2R45, ZG24P, taste 2 receptor member 45
- External IDs: OMIM: 613967; GeneCards: TAS2R45

Gene location (Human)
Chr.	Chromosome 12 (human)
Band	12p13.2	Start	11,182,986 bp
Band	12p13.2	End	11,184,006 bp
Gene ontology
Molecular function	G protein-coupled receptor activity; signal transducer activity; bitter taste receptor activity
Cellular component	integral component of membrane; plasma membrane; membrane
Biological process	detection of chemical stimulus involved in sensory perception of bitter taste; signal transduction; response to stimulus; sensory perception of taste; G protein-coupled receptor signaling pathway
Sources:Amigo / QuickGO
Orthologs
Databases	NCBI: entry; OMA: entry
Species	Human	Mouse
Entrez	259291	n/a
Ensembl	ENSG00000261936	n/a
UniProt	P59539	n/a
RefSeq (mRNA)	NM_176886	n/a
RefSeq (protein)	NP_795367	n/a
Location (UCSC)	Chr 12: 11.18 – 11.18 Mb	n/a
PubMed search		n/a
- Wikidata
View/Edit Human

Taste receptor type 2 member 45 is a protein that in humans is encoded by the TAS2R45 gene.

== See also ==
- Taste receptor
