= TAS2R19 =

Protein-coding gene in the species Homo sapiens

Identifiers
- Aliases: TAS2R19, MSTP058, T2R19, T2R23, T2R48, TAS2R23, TAS2R48, taste 2 receptor member 19
- External IDs: OMIM: 613961; MGI: 2681304; GeneCards: TAS2R19

Gene location (Human)
Chr.	Chromosome 12 (human)
Band	12p13.2	Start	11,021,619 bp
Band	12p13.2	End	11,022,620 bp

Gene location (Mouse)
Chr.	Chromosome 6 (mouse)
Band	6 G1|6 64.03 cM	Start	132,754,142 bp
Band	6 G1|6 64.03 cM	End	132,755,125 bp
RNA expression pattern
Bgee	Human / Mouse (ortholog); Top expressed in: testicle; corpus callosum; Achilles tendon; epithelium of colon; tonsil; left ovary; cerebellar cortex; cerebellar hemisphere; right hemisphere of cerebellum; stromal cell of endometrium / n/a; More reference expression data
BioGPS	n/a
Gene ontology
Molecular function	G protein-coupled receptor activity; signal transducer activity; bitter taste receptor activity
Cellular component	integral component of membrane; plasma membrane; membrane
Biological process	detection of chemical stimulus involved in sensory perception of bitter taste; signal transduction; response to stimulus; sensory perception of taste; G protein-coupled receptor signaling pathway
Sources:Amigo / QuickGO
Orthologs
Databases	NCBI: entry; OMA: entry
Species	Human	Mouse
Entrez	259294	353165
Ensembl	ENSG00000212124	ENSMUSG00000053217
UniProt	P59542	Q7TQA8
RefSeq (mRNA)	NM_176888	NM_181276
RefSeq (protein)	NP_795369	NP_851793
Location (UCSC)	Chr 12: 11.02 – 11.02 Mb	Chr 6: 132.75 – 132.76 Mb
PubMed search
- Wikidata
View/Edit Human	View/Edit Mouse

Taste receptor type 2 member 19 is a protein that in humans is encoded by the TAS2R19 gene. It seems to be involved in the perception of salt and bitter tastes.

== See also ==
- Taste receptor
