= TAS2R50 =

Protein-coding gene in the species Homo sapiens

Identifiers
- Aliases: TAS2R50, T2R50, T2R51, TAS2R51, taste 2 receptor member 50
- External IDs: OMIM: 609627; MGI: 2681304; GeneCards: TAS2R50

Gene location (Human)
Chr.	Chromosome 12 (human)
Band	12p13.2	Start	10,985,913 bp
Band	12p13.2	End	10,986,912 bp

Gene location (Mouse)
Chr.	Chromosome 6 (mouse)
Band	6 G1|6 64.03 cM	Start	132,754,142 bp
Band	6 G1|6 64.03 cM	End	132,755,125 bp
RNA expression pattern
Bgee	Human / Mouse (ortholog); Top expressed in: testicle; corpus callosum; Achilles tendon; epithelium of colon; tonsil; skeletal muscle tissue; sural nerve; granulocyte; monocyte; cerebellar hemisphere / n/a; More reference expression data
BioGPS	n/a
Gene ontology
Molecular function	G protein-coupled receptor activity; signal transducer activity; bitter taste receptor activity
Cellular component	plasma membrane; membrane; integral component of membrane
Biological process	detection of chemical stimulus involved in sensory perception of bitter taste; signal transduction; response to stimulus; sensory perception of taste; G protein-coupled receptor signaling pathway
Sources:Amigo / QuickGO
Orthologs
Databases	NCBI: entry; OMA: entry
Species	Human	Mouse
Entrez	259296	353165
Ensembl	ENSG00000212126	ENSMUSG00000053217
UniProt	P59544	Q7TQA8
RefSeq (mRNA)	NM_176890	NM_181276
RefSeq (protein)	NP_795371	NP_851793
Location (UCSC)	Chr 12: 10.99 – 10.99 Mb	Chr 6: 132.75 – 132.76 Mb
PubMed search
- Wikidata
View/Edit Human	View/Edit Mouse

Taste receptor type 2 member 50 is a protein that in humans is encoded by the TAS2R50 gene.

== Function ==
TAS2R50 belongs to the large TAS2R receptor family. TAS2Rs are expressed on the surface of taste receptor cells and mediate the perception of bitterness through a G protein-coupled second messenger pathway. See also TAS2R10.

== See also ==
- Taste receptor
