= TAS2R40 =

Protein-coding gene in the species Homo sapiens

Identifiers
- Aliases: TAS2R40, GPR60, T2R40, T2R58, taste 2 receptor member 40
- External IDs: OMIM: 613964; MGI: 2681312; GeneCards: TAS2R40

Gene location (Human)
Chr.	Chromosome 7 (human)
Band	7q34	Start	143,222,037 bp
Band	7q34	End	143,223,079 bp

Gene location (Mouse)
Chr.	Chromosome 6 (mouse)
Band	6|6 B2.1	Start	42,192,262 bp
Band	6|6 B2.1	End	42,193,221 bp
RNA expression pattern
Bgee	Human / Mouse (ortholog); Top expressed in: corpus callosum; blood; white blood cell; monocyte; sural nerve; spleen; appendix; right lung; left uterine tube; upper lobe of lung / n/a; More reference expression data
BioGPS	n/a
Gene ontology
Molecular function	G protein-coupled receptor activity; signal transducer activity; bitter taste receptor activity
Cellular component	plasma membrane; membrane; integral component of membrane
Biological process	detection of chemical stimulus involved in sensory perception of bitter taste; signal transduction; response to stimulus; sensory perception of taste; G protein-coupled receptor signaling pathway
Sources:Amigo / QuickGO
Orthologs
Databases	NCBI: entry; OMA: entry
Species	Human	Mouse
Entrez	259286	387515
Ensembl	ENSG00000221937	ENSMUSG00000051917
UniProt	P59535	Q7TQB8
RefSeq (mRNA)	NM_176882	NM_001001453
RefSeq (protein)	NP_795363	NP_001001453
Location (UCSC)	Chr 7: 143.22 – 143.22 Mb	Chr 6: 42.19 – 42.19 Mb
PubMed search
- Wikidata
View/Edit Human	View/Edit Mouse

Taste receptor type 2 member 40 is a protein that in humans is encoded by the TAS2R40 gene.

== See also ==
- Taste receptor
