= TAS2R31 =

Protein-coding gene in the species Homo sapiens

Identifiers
- Aliases: TAS2R31, T2R31, T2R44, T2R53, TAS2R44, taste 2 receptor member 31
- External IDs: OMIM: 612669; MGI: 2681304; GeneCards: TAS2R31

Gene location (Human)
Chr.	Chromosome 12 (human)
Band	12p13.2	Start	11,030,387 bp
Band	12p13.2	End	11,031,407 bp

Gene location (Mouse)
Chr.	Chromosome 6 (mouse)
Band	6 G1|6 64.03 cM	Start	132,754,142 bp
Band	6 G1|6 64.03 cM	End	132,755,125 bp
RNA expression pattern
Bgee	Human / Mouse (ortholog); Top expressed in: testicle; corpus callosum; Achilles tendon; tonsil; epithelium of colon; endometrium; stromal cell of endometrium; left ovary; gastric mucosa; right ovary / n/a; More reference expression data
BioGPS	n/a
Gene ontology
Molecular function	signal transducer activity; G protein-coupled receptor activity; bitter taste receptor activity
Cellular component	plasma membrane; membrane; integral component of membrane
Biological process	detection of chemical stimulus involved in sensory perception of bitter taste; sensory perception of taste; signal transduction; response to stimulus; G protein-coupled receptor signaling pathway
Sources:Amigo / QuickGO
Orthologs
Databases	NCBI: entry; OMA: entry
Species	Human	Mouse
Entrez	259290	353165
Ensembl	ENSG00000256436; ENSG00000263097; ENSG00000282256	ENSMUSG00000053217
UniProt	P59538	Q7TQA8
RefSeq (mRNA)	NM_176885	NM_181276
RefSeq (protein)	NP_795366	NP_851793
Location (UCSC)	Chr 12: 11.03 – 11.03 Mb	Chr 6: 132.75 – 132.76 Mb
PubMed search
- Wikidata
View/Edit Human	View/Edit Mouse

Taste receptor, type 2, member 31, also known as TAS2R31, is a protein which in humans is encoded by the TAS2R31 gene. This bitter taste receptor has been shown to respond to saccharin in vitro.

TAS2R31 is also expressed in the smooth muscle of human airways, along with several other bitter taste receptors. Their activation in these cells causes an increase in intracellular calcium ion, which in turn triggers the opening of potassium channels which hyperpolarize the membrane and cause the smooth muscle to relax. Hence, activation of these receptors leads to bronchodilation.

Polymorphisms in this gene have been associated with the perceived bitterness of sweetener acesulfame potassium.

== See also ==
- Taste receptor
