= TAS2R14 agonist 28.1 =

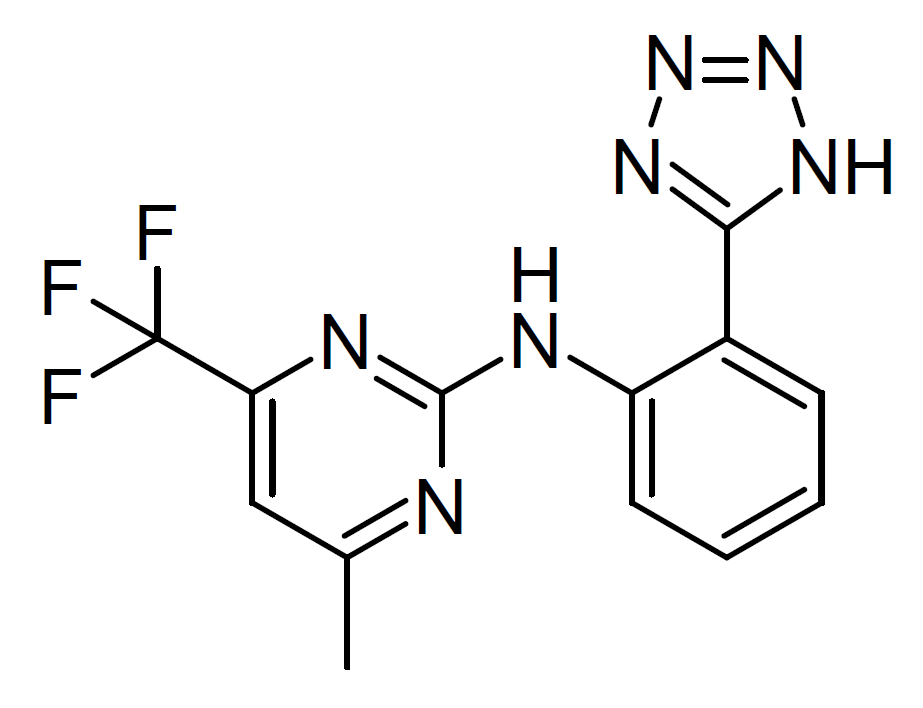

Identifiers
- IUPAC name: 4-methyl-N-[2-(2H-tetrazol-5-yl)phenyl]-6-(trifluoromethyl)pyrimidin-2-amine
- CAS Number: 2883007-69-8
- PubChem CID: 167312460
- ChemSpider: 129308500
- ChEMBL: ChEMBL5279691

Chemical and physical data
- Formula: C_{13}H_{10}F_{3}N_{7}
- Molar mass: 321.267 g·mol^{−1}
- 3D model (JSmol): Interactive image
- SMILES: CC1=CC(=NC(=N1)NC2=CC=CC=C2C3=NNN=N3)C(F)(F)F
- InChI: InChI=1S/C13H10F3N7/c1-7-6-10(13(14,15)16)19-12(17-7)18-9-5-3-2-4-8(9)11-20-22-23-21-11/h2-6H,1H3,(H,17,18,19)(H,20,21,22,23); Key:XXKGCSWBGJTTJM-UHFFFAOYSA-N

TAS2R14 agonist 28.1 (sometimes referred to simply as 28.1) is an experimental drug that acts as a potent and selective agonist of the bitter taste receptor TAS2R14. It was developed by modification of flufenamic acid, a pharmaceutical known for a foul, bitter taste which produces bitterness via activation of TAS2R14, but is around six times more potent. TAS2R14 is also expressed in the lungs and causes bronchodilatation, so synthetic TAS2R14 agonists may be useful in the treatment of asthma and other lung diseases.

== See also ==
- Amarogentin
- Oligoporin D
