= 3-Hydroxybenzoyl-CoA =

- Chemical structure of 3-Hydroxybenzoyl-CoA Chemical structure of 3-Hydroxybenzoyl-CoA

Names
- IUPAC name 3′-O-Phosphonoadenosine 5′-[(3R)-3-hydroxy-4-{[3-({2-[(3-hydroxybenzoyl)sulfanyl]ethyl}amino)-3-oxopropyl]amino}-2-methyl-4-oxobutyl dihydrogen diphosphate]
- Systematic IUPAC name O^{1}-{[(2R,3S,4R,5R)-5-(6-Amino-9H-purin-9-yl)-4-hydroxy-3-(phosphonooxy)oxolan-2-yl]methyl} O^{3}-[(3R)-3-hydroxy-4-{[3-({2-[(3-hydroxybenzoyl)sulfanyl]ethyl}amino)-3-oxopropyl]amino}-2-methyl-4-oxobutyl] dihydrogen diphosphate
- Other names: 3-Hydroxybenzoyl-coenzyme A; m-Hydroxybenzoyl-CoA; m-Hydroxybenzoyl-coenzyme A

Identifiers
CAS Number	52301-52-7
3D model (JSmol)	Interactive image
ChEBI	CHEBI:15484
ChemSpider	10140112
KEGG	C05195
PubChem CID	11966118
- InChI: InChI=1S/C28H40N7O18P3S/c1-28(2,22(39)25(40)31-7-6-18(37)30-8-9-57-27(41)15-4-3-5-16(36)10-15)12-50-56(47,48)53-55(45,46)49-11-17-21(52-54(42,43)44)20(38)26(51-17)35-14-34-19-23(29)32-13-33-24(19)35/h3-5,10,13-14,17,20-22,26,36,38-39H,6-9,11-12H2,1-2H3,(H,30,37)(H,31,40)(H,45,46)(H,47,48)(H2,29,32,33)(H2,42,43,44)/t17-,20-,21-,22+,26-/m1/s1 Key: JTBCMZVWWNFUFR-TYHXJLICSA-N
- SMILES: CC(C)(COP(=O)(O)OP(=O)(O)OCC1C(C(C(O1)N2C=NC3=C2N=CN=C3N)O)OP(=O (O)O)C(C(=O)NCCC(=O)NCCSC(=O)C4=CC(=CC=C4)O)O

Properties
Chemical formula	C_{28}H_{40}N_{7}O_{18}P_{3}S
Molar mass	887.64 g·mol^{−1}
- Except where otherwise noted, data are given for materials in their standard state (at 25 °C [77 °F], 100 kPa). Infobox references

3-Hydroxybenzoyl-CoA is a molecule formed by condensing the thiol group of coenzyme A (CoA) with the carboxylic acid group of 3-hydroxybenzoic acid. Stable in acidic conditions, it is a tetraprotic acid due to the pyrophosphate and phosphate groups included. It derives from a benzoyl-CoA and a 3-hydroxybenzoic acid. In organisms such as plants, this can be formed using the 3-hydroxybenzoate—CoA ligase enzyme. This uses ATP, 3-hydroxybenzoate, and CoA as substrates.

It can be reduced to 3-hydroxycyclohexa-1,5-diene-1-carbonyl-CoA by reduced ferredoxin and adenosine triphosphate using the benzoyl-CoA reductase enzyme. in this two hydrogen atoms are added to the benzene ring in a dearomatizing process.
