= TAS2R46 =

Protein-coding gene in the species Homo sapiens

Identifiers
- Aliases: TAS2R46, T2R46, T2R54, taste 2 receptor member 46
- External IDs: OMIM: 612774; MGI: 2681256; GeneCards: TAS2R46

Gene location (Human)
Chr.	Chromosome 12 (human)
Band	12p13.2	Start	11,061,365 bp
Band	12p13.2	End	11,062,294 bp

Gene location (Mouse)
Chr.	Chromosome 6 (mouse)
Band	6 G1|6 64.03 cM	Start	132,633,916 bp
Band	6 G1|6 64.03 cM	End	132,634,807 bp
RNA expression pattern
Bgee	Human / Mouse (ortholog); Top expressed in: testicle; corpus callosum; Achilles tendon; tonsil; epithelium of colon; muscle of thigh; skeletal muscle tissue; cell; stromal cell of endometrium; ventricular zone / n/a; More reference expression data
BioGPS	n/a
Gene ontology
Molecular function	G protein-coupled receptor activity; signal transducer activity; bitter taste receptor activity
Cellular component	plasma membrane; cell projection; cilium; membrane; ciliary membrane; integral component of membrane
Biological process	detection of chemical stimulus involved in sensory perception of bitter taste; signal transduction; response to stimulus; sensory perception of taste; G protein-coupled receptor signaling pathway
Sources:Amigo / QuickGO
Orthologs
Databases	NCBI: entry; OMA: entry
Species	Human	Mouse
Entrez	259292	387348
Ensembl	ENSG00000278111; ENSG00000262525; ENSG00000226761	ENSMUSG00000059382
UniProt	P59540	Q7M721
RefSeq (mRNA)	NM_176887	NM_207023
RefSeq (protein)	NP_795368	NP_996906
Location (UCSC)	Chr 12: 11.06 – 11.06 Mb	Chr 6: 132.63 – 132.63 Mb
PubMed search
- Wikidata
View/Edit Human	View/Edit Mouse

Taste receptor type 2 member 46 is a protein that in humans is encoded by the TAS2R46 gene.

Taste receptors for bitter substances (T2Rs/TAS2Rs) belong to the family of G-protein coupled receptors and are related to class A-like GPCRs. There are 25 known T2Rs in humans responsible for bitter taste perception.

== Gene ==
TAS2R46 gene (Taste receptor type 2 member 46) is a protein-coding gene. This gene maps to the taste receptor gene cluster on chromosome 12. hTAS2R46 is a bitter receptor broadly tuned to sesquiterpene lactones, related clerodane diterpenoids, labdane diterpenes and more.

== Structure ==
In 2022, the solved structure of Tas2r46 was published in the scientific journal Science making it the first Tas2r with a solved structure. The structure of Tas2r46 was solved with cryo-EM and can be downloaded in the Protein Data Bank, under the following names:

7xp6- Cryo-EM structure of a class T GPCR in active state,7xp5- Cryo-EM structure of a class T GPCR in ligand-free state,7xp4- Cryo-EM structure of a class T GPCR in apo state.

There is also a prediction structure available in Alphafold, named Taste receptor type 2 member 46 this is a computational prediction and not an experimental structure.

== Tissue distribution ==
TAS2R46 was shown to be expressed in other tissues in the human body apart from the oral cavity including human bone marrow stromal-derived cells (MSC) and their relatives, vascular smooth muscle cells (VSMC).

== Ligands ==
Up to now, 68 ligands were identified for T2R46 and are summarized in

Some of TAS2R46 ligands are approved as drugs; two of the more known ligands of TAS2R46 are atropine and strychnine.

Strychnine is known as a strong poison that suppresses the nerve system. Strychnine even makes an appearance in the famous Agatha Christie novel The Mysterious Affair at Styles.

Atropine injection is used to treat heart rate disorders of various types, and is used in drops to treat lazy eye condition.

Oligoporin D is one of the most potent agonists known for TAS2R46, and thus one of the most bitter substances known.

== Clinical significance ==
TAS2R46 was associated with Inflammatory Bowel Disease

== SNPs ==
Obtained from

Receptor	Location	BW number	Residue	MAF	dbSNP
TAS2R46	IC3		L228M	0.3359	rs2708380

== Known mutations ==
Known mutations of TAS2R46 include the following:

Receptor	Location	BW number	Residue	References
TAS2R46	TM2	2.6	N65	
TAS2R46	TM2	2.61	W66	
TAS2R46	TM2	2.64	T69	
TAS2R46	TM2	2.65	E70	
TAS2R46	EC1	2.66	L71	
TAS2R46	TM3	3.26	I82	
TAS2R46	TM3	3.29	Y85	
TAS2R46	TM3	3.3	N86	
TAS2R46	TM3	3.32	W88	
TAS2R46	TM3	3.33	A89	
TAS2R46	TM3	3.36	N92	
TAS2R46	TM3	3.37	H93	
TAS2R46	TM3	3.4	N96	
TAS2R46	TM4	4.6	I147	
TAS2R46	EC2	4.65	N150	
TAS2R46	EC2	4.76	N161	
TAS2R46	TM5	5.38	S175	
TAS2R46	TM5	5.39	N176	
TAS2R46	TM5	5.43	T180	
TAS2R46	TM5	5.47	N184	
TAS2R46	TM6	6.51	Y241	
TAS2R46	TM6	6.52	F242	
TAS2R46	TM6	6.54	S244	
TAS2R46	TM6	6.55	I245	
TAS2R46	TM6	6.58	S248	
TAS2R46	TM6	6.59	V249	
TAS2R46	EC3	6.62	E253	
TAS2R46	TM7	7.35	E261	
TAS2R46	TM7	7.39	E265	
TAS2R46	TM7	7.42	A268	
TAS2R46	TM7	7.43	F269	
