= TAS2R42 =

Protein-coding gene in the species Homo sapiens

Identifiers
- Aliases: TAS2R42, T2R24, T2R42, T2R55, TAS2R55, taste 2 receptor member 42
- External IDs: OMIM: 613966; MGI: 2681280; GeneCards: TAS2R42

Gene location (Human)
Chr.	Chromosome 12 (human)
Band	12p13.2	Start	11,185,993 bp
Band	12p13.2	End	11,186,937 bp

Gene location (Mouse)
Chr.	Chromosome 6 (mouse)
Band	6 G1|6 64.03 cM	Start	132,933,847 bp
Band	6 G1|6 64.03 cM	End	132,934,882 bp
RNA expression pattern
Bgee	Human / Mouse (ortholog); Top expressed in: testicle; tonsil; superior frontal gyrus; ganglionic eminence; renal cortex; myeloid leukocyte; monocyte; duodenum; lymph node; islet of Langerhans / n/a; More reference expression data
BioGPS	n/a
Gene ontology
Molecular function	G protein-coupled receptor activity; signal transducer activity; bitter taste receptor activity
Cellular component	integral component of membrane; plasma membrane; membrane
Biological process	detection of chemical stimulus involved in sensory perception of bitter taste; signal transduction; response to stimulus; sensory perception of taste; G protein-coupled receptor signaling pathway
Sources:Amigo / QuickGO
Orthologs
Databases	NCBI: entry; OMA: entry
Species	Human	Mouse
Entrez	353164	387356
Ensembl	ENSG00000273505; ENSG00000186136	ENSMUSG00000057699
UniProt	Q7RTR8	Q7M708
RefSeq (mRNA)	NM_181429	NM_207030
RefSeq (protein)	NP_852094	NP_996913
Location (UCSC)	Chr 12: 11.19 – 11.19 Mb	Chr 6: 132.93 – 132.93 Mb
PubMed search
- Wikidata
View/Edit Human	View/Edit Mouse

Taste receptor, type 2, member 42 is a protein that in humans is encoded by the TAS2R42 gene.
