= TAS2R39 =

Protein-coding gene in the species Homo sapiens

Identifiers
- Aliases: TAS2R39, T2R39, T2R57, taste 2 receptor member 39
- External IDs: MGI: 2681308; GeneCards: TAS2R39
Available structures
PDB	Ortholog search: PDBe RCSB
PDB	List of PDB id codes 2GFZ

Gene location (Human)
Chr.	Chromosome 7 (human)
Band	7q34	Start	143,183,419 bp
Band	7q34	End	143,184,435 bp

Gene location (Mouse)
Chr.	Chromosome 6 (mouse)
Band	6|6 B2.1	Start	42,117,870 bp
Band	6|6 B2.1	End	42,118,829 bp
RNA expression pattern
Bgee	Human / Mouse (ortholog); Top expressed in: testicle; corpus callosum; C1 segment / Top expressed in: embryo; More reference expression data
BioGPS	n/a
Gene ontology
Molecular function	G protein-coupled receptor activity; signal transducer activity; bitter taste receptor activity
Cellular component	plasma membrane; membrane; integral component of membrane
Biological process	detection of chemical stimulus involved in sensory perception of bitter taste; signal transduction; response to stimulus; sensory perception of taste; G protein-coupled receptor signaling pathway
Sources:Amigo / QuickGO
Orthologs
Databases	NCBI: entry; OMA: entry
Species	Human	Mouse
Entrez	259285	353148
Ensembl	ENSG00000236398	ENSMUSG00000047102
UniProt	P59534	Q7TQA5
RefSeq (mRNA)	NM_176881	NM_181275
RefSeq (protein)	NP_795362	NP_851792
Location (UCSC)	Chr 7: 143.18 – 143.18 Mb	Chr 6: 42.12 – 42.12 Mb
PubMed search
- Wikidata
View/Edit Human	View/Edit Mouse

Taste receptor type 2 member 39 is a protein that in humans is encoded by the TAS2R39 gene.

== See also ==
- Taste receptor
