= TAS2R43 =

Protein-coding gene in the species Homo sapiens

Identifiers
- Aliases: TAS2R43, T2R43, T2R52, taste 2 receptor member 43
- External IDs: OMIM: 612668; MGI: 2681304; GeneCards: TAS2R43

Gene location (Human)
Chr.	Chromosome 12 (human)
Band	12p13.2	Start	11,091,287 bp
Band	12p13.2	End	11,092,313 bp

Gene location (Mouse)
Chr.	Chromosome 6 (mouse)
Band	6 G1|6 64.03 cM	Start	132,754,142 bp
Band	6 G1|6 64.03 cM	End	132,755,125 bp
RNA expression pattern
Bgee	Human / Mouse (ortholog); Top expressed in: testicle; muscle of thigh; tonsil; Achilles tendon; sural nerve; apex of heart; urinary bladder; ganglionic eminence; renal cortex; ectocervix / n/a; More reference expression data
BioGPS	n/a
Gene ontology
Molecular function	G protein-coupled receptor activity; signal transducer activity; taste receptor activity; bitter taste receptor activity
Cellular component	plasma membrane; cell projection; motile cilium; cilium; membrane; ciliary membrane; integral component of membrane
Biological process	detection of chemical stimulus involved in sensory perception of bitter taste; signal transduction; response to stimulus; sensory perception of taste; G protein-coupled receptor signaling pathway
Sources:Amigo / QuickGO
Orthologs
Databases	NCBI: entry; OMA: entry
Species	Human	Mouse
Entrez	259289	353165
Ensembl	ENSG00000255374; ENSG00000262612; ENSG00000282537	ENSMUSG00000053217
UniProt	P59537	Q7TQA8
RefSeq (mRNA)	NM_176884	NM_181276
RefSeq (protein)	NP_795365	NP_851793
Location (UCSC)	Chr 12: 11.09 – 11.09 Mb	Chr 6: 132.75 – 132.76 Mb
PubMed search
- Wikidata
View/Edit Human	View/Edit Mouse

Taste receptor type 2 member 43 is a protein that in humans is encoded by the TAS2R43 gene.

== See also ==
- Taste receptor
