= TAS2R5 =

Protein-coding gene in the species Homo sapiens

Identifiers
- Aliases: TAS2R5, T2R5, taste 2 receptor member 5
- External IDs: OMIM: 605062; GeneCards: TAS2R5

Gene location (Human)
Chr.	Chromosome 7 (human)
Band	7q34	Start	141,790,217 bp
Band	7q34	End	141,791,367 bp
RNA expression pattern
Bgee	Human / Mouse (ortholog); Top expressed in: testicle; right uterine tube; left ovary; right ovary; right hemisphere of cerebellum; canal of the cervix; ectocervix; body of uterus; tibial nerve; skin of abdomen / n/a; More reference expression data
BioGPS	n/a
Gene ontology
Molecular function	G protein-coupled receptor activity; signal transducer activity; taste receptor activity; bitter taste receptor activity
Cellular component	plasma membrane; membrane; integral component of membrane
Biological process	chemosensory behavior; detection of chemical stimulus involved in sensory perception of bitter taste; sensory perception of taste; signal transduction; response to stimulus; G protein-coupled receptor signaling pathway
Sources:Amigo / QuickGO
Orthologs
Databases	NCBI: entry; OMA: entry
Species	Human	Mouse
Entrez	54429	n/a
Ensembl	ENSG00000127366	n/a
UniProt	Q9NYW4	n/a
RefSeq (mRNA)	NM_018980	n/a
RefSeq (protein)	NP_061853	n/a
Location (UCSC)	Chr 7: 141.79 – 141.79 Mb	n/a
PubMed search		n/a
- Wikidata
View/Edit Human

Taste receptor type 2 member 5 is a protein that in humans is encoded by the TAS2R5 gene.

== Function ==
This gene encodes a bitter taste receptor; bitter taste receptors are members of the G protein-coupled receptor superfamily and are specifically expressed by taste receptor cells of the tongue and palate epithelia. Each of these apparently intronless taste receptor genes encodes a 7-transmembrane receptor protein, functioning as a bitter taste receptor. This gene is clustered with another 3 candidate taste receptor genes on chromosome 7 and is genetically linked to loci that influence bitter perception.

== See also ==
- Taste receptor
