= TAS2R30 =

Protein-coding gene in humans

Identifiers
- Aliases: TAS2R30, T2R30, T2R47, TAS2R47, taste 2 receptor member 30
- External IDs: OMIM: 613963; MGI: 2681304; GeneCards: TAS2R30

Gene location (Human)
Chr.	Chromosome 12 (human)
Band	12p13.2	Start	11,132,958 bp
Band	12p13.2	End	11,134,644 bp

Gene location (Mouse)
Chr.	Chromosome 6 (mouse)
Band	6 G1|6 64.03 cM	Start	132,754,142 bp
Band	6 G1|6 64.03 cM	End	132,755,125 bp
RNA expression pattern
Bgee	Human / Mouse (ortholog); Top expressed in: corpus callosum; testicle; Achilles tendon; bone marrow cell; sural nerve; epithelium of colon; tonsil; muscle of thigh; skeletal muscle tissue; ventricular zone / n/a; More reference expression data
BioGPS	n/a
Gene ontology
Molecular function	G protein-coupled receptor activity; signal transducer activity; bitter taste receptor activity
Cellular component	plasma membrane; membrane; integral component of membrane
Biological process	detection of chemical stimulus involved in sensory perception of bitter taste; signal transduction; response to stimulus; sensory perception of taste; G protein-coupled receptor signaling pathway
Sources:Amigo / QuickGO
Orthologs
Databases	NCBI: entry; OMA: entry
Species	Human	Mouse
Entrez	259293	353165
Ensembl	ENSG00000262111; ENSG00000274699; ENSG00000256188	ENSMUSG00000053217
UniProt	P59541	Q7TQA8
RefSeq (mRNA)	NM_001097643	NM_181276
RefSeq (protein)	NP_001091112	NP_851793
Location (UCSC)	Chr 12: 11.13 – 11.13 Mb	Chr 6: 132.75 – 132.76 Mb
PubMed search
- Wikidata
View/Edit Human	View/Edit Mouse

Taste receptor type 2 member 30 is a protein that in humans is encoded by the TAS2R30 gene.

== See also ==
- Taste receptor
