= TAS2R13 =

Protein-coding gene in the species Homo sapiens

Identifiers
- Aliases: TAS2R13, T2R13, TRB3, taste 2 receptor member 13
- External IDs: OMIM: 604792; MGI: 2681259; GeneCards: TAS2R13

Gene location (Human)
Chr.	Chromosome 12 (human)
Band	12p13.2	Start	10,907,926 bp
Band	12p13.2	End	10,909,562 bp

Gene location (Mouse)
Chr.	Chromosome 6 (mouse)
Band	6 G1|6 64.03 cM	Start	132,677,053 bp
Band	6 G1|6 64.03 cM	End	132,677,970 bp
RNA expression pattern
Bgee	Human / Mouse (ortholog); Top expressed in: testicle; corpus callosum; Achilles tendon; bone marrow cell; sural nerve; tonsil; skeletal muscle tissue; ventricular zone; urinary bladder; liver / n/a; More reference expression data
BioGPS	n/a
Gene ontology
Molecular function	G protein-coupled receptor activity; signal transducer activity; taste receptor activity; bitter taste receptor activity
Cellular component	plasma membrane; membrane; integral component of membrane
Biological process	positive regulation of cytokinesis; detection of chemical stimulus involved in sensory perception of bitter taste; signal transduction; response to stimulus; sensory perception of taste; G protein-coupled receptor signaling pathway
Sources:Amigo / QuickGO
Orthologs
Databases	NCBI: entry; OMA: entry
Species	Human	Mouse
Entrez	50838	387349
Ensembl	ENSG00000212128; ENSG00000277254; ENSG00000273457	ENSMUSG00000071150
UniProt	Q9NYV9	Q7M720
RefSeq (mRNA)	NM_023920	NM_207024
RefSeq (protein)	NP_076409	NP_996907
Location (UCSC)	Chr 12: 10.91 – 10.91 Mb	Chr 6: 132.68 – 132.68 Mb
PubMed search
- Wikidata
View/Edit Human	View/Edit Mouse

Taste receptor type 2 member 13 is a protein that in humans is encoded by the TAS2R13 gene.

== Function ==
This gene product belongs to the family of candidate taste receptors that are members of the G-protein-coupled receptor superfamily. These proteins are specifically expressed in the taste receptor cells of the tongue and palate epithelia. They are organized in the genome in clusters and are genetically linked to loci that influence bitter perception in mice and humans. In functional expression studies, they respond to bitter tastants. This gene maps to the taste receptor gene cluster on chromosome 12p13.

== See also ==
- Taste receptor
