= BitterDB =

Content
- Description: Bitter compounds.

Contact
- Research center: The Hebrew University of Jerusalem Rehovot, Israel.
- Laboratory: The Robert H Smith Faculty of Agriculture
- Authors: Ayana Wiener
- Primary citation: Wiener & al. (2012)
- Release date: 2011

Access
- Website: https://bitterdb.agri.huji.ac.il

Tools
- Web: blast

The BitterDB is a database of compounds that were reported to taste bitter to humans. The aim of the BitterDB database is to gather information about bitter-tasting natural and synthetic compounds, and their cognate bitter taste receptors (T2Rs or TAS2Rs).

== Summary ==
The BitterDB includes over 670 compounds that were reported to taste bitter to humans. The compounds can be searched by name, chemical structure, similarity to other bitter compounds, association with a particular human bitter taste receptor, and by other properties as well. The database also contains information on mutations in bitter taste receptors that were shown to influence receptor activation by bitter compounds.

== Database overview ==
=== Bitter compounds ===
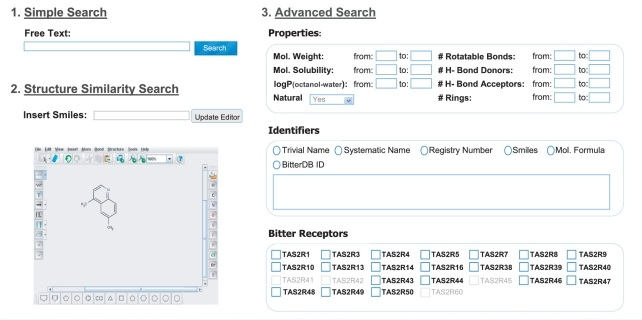
Search Examples of bitter compounds in BitterDB

BitterDB currently contains more than 670 compounds that were cited in the literature as bitter. For each compound, the database offers information regarding its molecular properties, references for the compound’s bitterness, including additional information about the bitterness category of the compound (e.g. a ‘bitter-sweet’ or ‘slightly bitter’ annotation), different compound identifiers (SMILES, CAS registry number, IUPAC systematic name), an indication whether the compound is derived from a natural source or is synthetic, a link to the compound’s PubChem entry and different file formats for downloading (sdf, image, smiles). Over 200 bitter compounds have been experimentally linked to their corresponding human bitter taste receptors. For those compounds, BitterDB provides additional information, including links to the publications indicating these ligand–receptor interactions, the effective concentration for receptor activation and/or the EC50 value and links to the associated bitter taste receptors entries in the BitterDB.

==== Querying and browsing ====
Bitter compounds can be queried and browsed in different ways. For example, the 'advanced search' option allows the user to retrieve compounds that fit different criteria, such as a combination of specific physical properties or a combination of associated human bitter taste receptors. In addition to the querying options, the user can browse through a sortable table with all the BitterDB compounds.

=== Bitter taste receptors ===
BitterDB contains data about the 25 known human bitter taste receptors. Several properties are displayed for each receptor. The bitter taste receptors can be searched using different criteria: name, known ligands and UniProt accession number. Using a table that presents all the bitter taste receptors and some information about them, the user can browse and sort by various options, such as the number of bitter ligands associated with the receptor.

=== Local BLAST service and global alignment ===
BitterDB offers two additional features: a local BLAST service to determine the local similarity between a query sequence and the different human bitter taste receptors, and a global alignment of the 25 human bitter taste receptors. The alignment was generated using ClustalW2, and displays the secondary structure of each receptor, as predicted by the TOPCONS server.

=== Uploading compounds ===
BitterDB offers an ‘upload’ option, where the users are encouraged to submit information about bitter compounds. This data will be reviewed by the authors and uploaded to the database accordingly. The users can join the mailing list in order to receive database updates.

== See also ==
- Bitter
