= TAS2R16 =

Protein-coding gene in the species Homo sapiens

Identifiers
- Aliases: TAS2R16, T2R16, taste 2 receptor member 16, BGLPT
- External IDs: OMIM: 604867; MGI: 2681247; GeneCards: TAS2R16

Gene location (Human)
Chr.	Chromosome 7 (human)
Band	7q31.32|7q31	Start	122,994,704 bp
Band	7q31.32|7q31	End	122,995,700 bp

Gene location (Mouse)
Chr.	Chromosome 6 (mouse)
Band	6|6 A3.1	Start	23,969,160 bp
Band	6|6 A3.1	End	23,970,059 bp
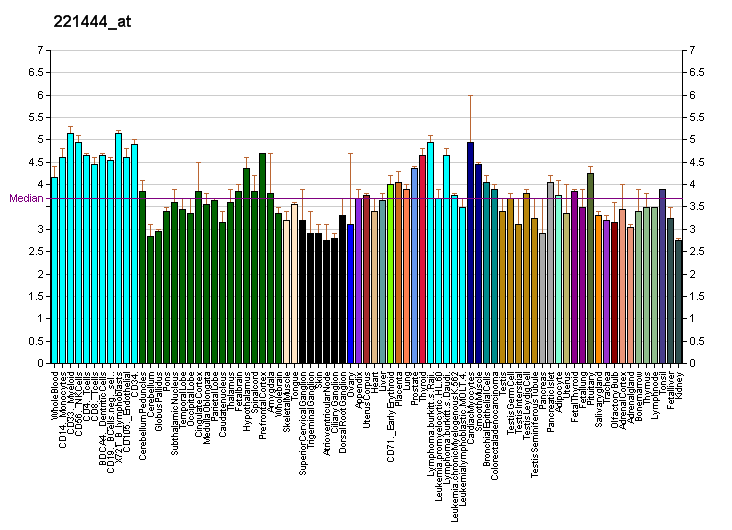
RNA expression pattern
Bgee	Human / Mouse (ortholog); Top expressed in: tibialis anterior muscle; gonad; deltoid muscle; hypothalamus / n/a; More reference expression data
BioGPS	More reference expression data
Gene ontology
Molecular function	G protein-coupled receptor activity; protein binding; signal transducer activity; bitter taste receptor activity
Cellular component	trans-Golgi network; plasma membrane; endoplasmic reticulum; external side of plasma membrane; membrane; integral component of membrane
Biological process	detection of chemical stimulus involved in sensory perception of bitter taste; signal transduction; response to stimulus; sensory perception of taste; G protein-coupled receptor signaling pathway
Sources:Amigo / QuickGO
Orthologs
Databases	NCBI: entry; OMA: entry
Species	Human	Mouse
Entrez	50833	387347
Ensembl	ENSG00000128519	ENSMUSG00000043865
UniProt	Q9NYV7	P59529
RefSeq (mRNA)	NM_016945	NM_207022
RefSeq (protein)	NP_058641	NP_996905
Location (UCSC)	Chr 7: 122.99 – 123 Mb	Chr 6: 23.97 – 23.97 Mb
PubMed search
- Wikidata
View/Edit Human	View/Edit Mouse

TAS2R16 (taste receptor, type 2, member 16) is a bitter taste receptor and one of the 25 TAS2Rs. TAS2Rs are receptors that belong to the G-protein-coupled receptors (GPCRs) family. These receptors detect various bitter substances found in nature as agonists, and get stimulated. TAS2R16 receptor is mainly expressed within taste buds present on the surface of the tongue and palate epithelium. TAS2R16 is activated by bitter β-glucopyranosides (such as salicin)

== Other names ==
T2R16, Taste receptor 2 member 16, BGLPT.

== Gene ==
The receptor is encoded by the TAS2R16 human gene which located on the long (q) arm of chromosome 7 at position 31.1-31.3, 997 bases. This gene is specifically expressed by taste receptor cells of the tongue and palate epithelia. Different individuals may have variations in the TAS2R16 gene, which can influence their sensitivity or preference for certain bitter compounds.

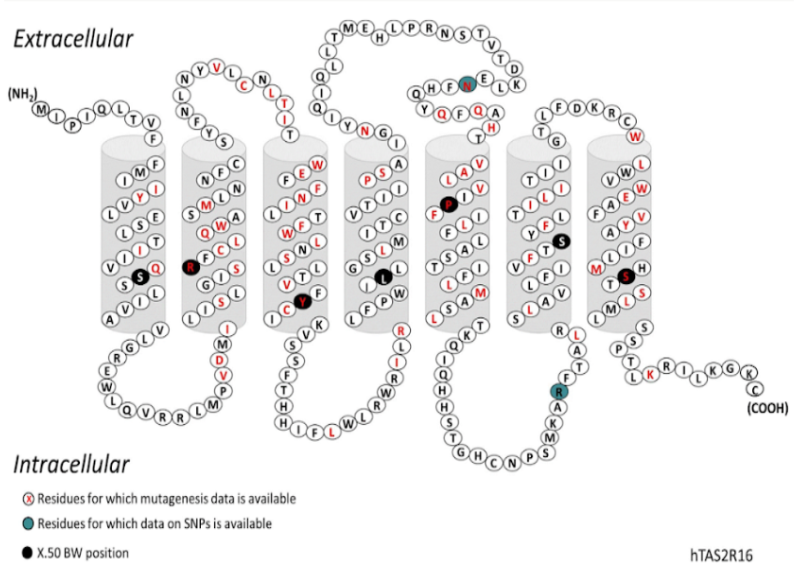
2D transmembrane protein diagram

== Structure ==
TAS2R16 consists of 291 amino acids. Molecular weight: 33,986 (Da). The receptor has 7 transmembrane helices, 3 intracellular loops and 3 extracellular loops. there are some conserved residues (black) and residues for which mutagenesis data is available.

== Function ==
The function of TAS2R16 is to bind to specific bitter-tasting molecules present in various foods, plants, and potentially harmful substances. When binding to these molecules, TAS2R16 initiates a signaling cascade that leads to the transmission of signals to the brain, which results in the perception of bitterness. TAS2R16 specifically is believed to play a central role in determining human preference to eat or avoid such vegetables with bitter β-glucosides, important dietary choices that ultimately influence human health.

The signaling pathway includes two essential components of the well-established taste signal transduction cascade: phospholipase C isoform β2 (PLCβ2) and the ion channel known as transient receptor potential cation channel subfamily M member 5 (TRPM5). Ca2+-flux signaling assays are commonly used to measure the function of TAS2R16 and other GPCRs, so this measurement represents the key function of the receptor.

== Ligands (from BitterDB) ==
There are 13 known ligands for TAS2R16.

Diphenidol (synthetic)	D-salicin, Salicin
Sodium Benzoate (synthetic)	Phenyl beta -D-glucopyranoside
Amygdalin, D	Esculine Aesculin
Arbutin	2-Naphthyl beta-D-glucopyranoside
Helicin	Methyl beta-D-glucoside
sinigrin	2-nitro phenyl beta -D-glucopyranoside

The most well-studied natural ligand of TAS2R16 is salicin. In previous researches which analyzed how this receptor binds and signals, 38 residues that may be involved in signal transduction and 13 residues that contribute to ligand-specific interactions, were found to be involved.

β-glucoside analogues are specific agonists of TAS2R16 in humans. These analogues, such as natural toxins, are molecular scafold consists of a D-glucose monosaccharide linked by an oxygen atom to a phenyl group. Arbutin was the first known natural inverse agonist for TAS2Rs.

Many plants, including cruciferous vegetables such as broccoli and brussels sprouts, contain bitter β-glucosides such as salicin, sinigrin, arbutin, and amygdalin.

== Single nucleotide polymorphisms ==
Taste receptors harbor many polymorphisms, and several SNPs have a profound impact on the gene function and expression.

Alleles	SNP ID
A > C, G	rs846664
C > T	rs860170
C > G, T	rs1204014
T > C, G	rs978739
A > C, T	rs846672
G > A, C, T	rs1308724

Recently studies have shown that mutation of the TAS2R16 gene could affect the intake of vegetables and anti-inflammatory food, which would influence age-related inflammatory diseases and increase the human lifespan. In addition, polymorphism of the TAS2R16 gene seems to affect body mass index, alcohol intake, smoking and drug compliance. Many bitter natural foods have the function of heat-clearing, detoxifying, anti-inflammatory, and antibacterial effects.

== Alcohol dependence ==
Alcohol intake habits may be affected by the genetic diversity of taste preferences. Alcohol dependence is significantly associated with the coding single-nucleotide polymorphism (cSNP) K172N in the gene hTAS2R16, which codes for a taste receptor for bitter b-glucopyranosides. This gene is found on chromosome 7q in a region that has been linked to alcoholism in some studies. The risk of alcohol use is higher in people with the ancestral gene K172. Individuals with this allele are at increased risk of alcohol dependence, regardless of ethnicity. However, this risk allele is rare in European Americans, but 45% of African Americans carry the allele, makes it a much more significant risk factor in the African American population.

== Longevity ==
In a population of 941 individuals ranging from 60 to 106 years of age from the South of Italy, five significant associations between the SNPs in the chromosome 7 cluster and longevity was found, Three of them – observed in TAS2R16. SNP rs978739 showed a statistically significant association with longevity. The frequency of homozygotes A/A increases gradually from 35% in the subjects aged 20 to 70 up to 55% in centenarians.

== See also ==
- Taste receptor
