= TAS2R10 =

Protein-coding gene in the species Homo sapiens

Identifiers
- Aliases: TAS2R10, T2R10, TRB2, taste 2 receptor member 10
- External IDs: OMIM: 604791; MGI: 2681218; GeneCards: TAS2R10

Gene location (Human)
Chr.	Chromosome 12 (human)
Band	12p13.2	Start	10,825,317 bp
Band	12p13.2	End	10,826,358 bp

Gene location (Mouse)
Chr.	Chromosome 6 (mouse)
Band	6|6 F3	Start	131,666,097 bp
Band	6|6 F3	End	131,667,026 bp
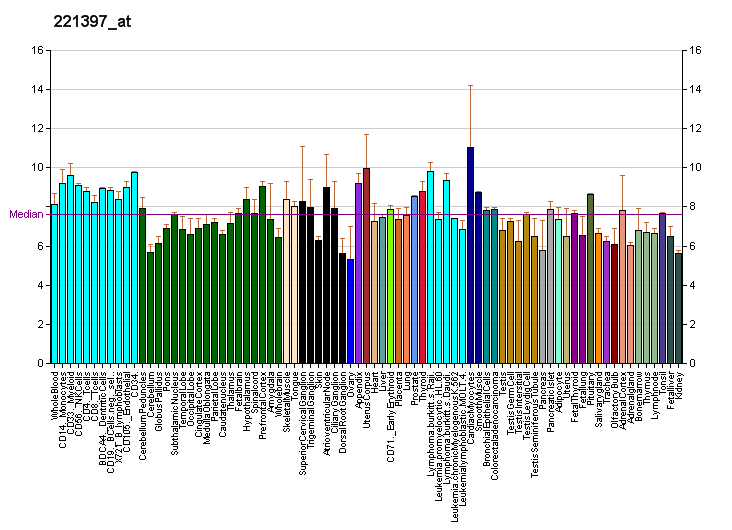
RNA expression pattern
Bgee	Human / Mouse (ortholog); Top expressed in: right adrenal cortex; Achilles tendon; endometrium; left adrenal cortex; corpus callosum; granulocyte; right ovary; stromal cell of endometrium; body of uterus; gastric mucosa / n/a; More reference expression data
BioGPS	More reference expression data
Gene ontology
Molecular function	G protein-coupled receptor activity; signal transducer activity; taste receptor activity; bitter taste receptor activity
Cellular component	plasma membrane; membrane; integral component of membrane
Biological process	detection of chemical stimulus involved in sensory perception of bitter taste; signal transduction; response to stimulus; sensory perception of taste; G protein-coupled receptor signaling pathway
Sources:Amigo / QuickGO
Orthologs
Databases	NCBI: entry; OMA: entry
Species	Human	Mouse
Entrez	50839	387346
Ensembl	ENSG00000272805; ENSG00000121318; ENSG00000277238	ENSMUSG00000063478
UniProt	Q9NYW0	Q7M722
RefSeq (mRNA)	NM_023921	NM_207019
RefSeq (protein)	NP_076410	NP_996902
Location (UCSC)	Chr 12: 10.83 – 10.83 Mb	Chr 6: 131.67 – 131.67 Mb
PubMed search
- Wikidata
View/Edit Human	View/Edit Mouse

Taste receptor type 2 member 10 is a protein that in humans is encoded by the TAS2R10 gene. The protein is responsible for bitter taste recognition in mammals. It serves as a defense mechanism to prevent consumption of toxic substances which often have a characteristic bitter taste.

== Function ==
TAS2R10 is a G-protein-coupled receptor (GPCR) that is part of a large group of eukaryotic membrane receptors. As a G-protein linked receptor, TAS2R10 helps with relaying communication across the cell membrane between the extracellular and intracellular matrix. Signaling molecules (ligands) bind to GPCRs and cause activation of the G protein which leads to activation of second messenger systems. These messengers inform cells of the presence or lack of substances in their environment which signals effectors to carryout biological functions.

TAS2R10 specifically acts as a bitter taste receptor. In general, TAS1Rs are receptors for umami and sweet tastes and TAS2Rs are bitter receptors. Bitter taste is mediated by numerous receptors, with TAS2R10 being part of a G-protein-coupled receptor superfamily. Humans have almost 1,000 different and highly specific GPCRs. Each GPCRs binds to a specific signaling molecule.

TAS2R10, along with several other bitter taste receptors, is expressed in the taste receptor cells of the tongue palate epithelia and smooth muscle of human airways. They are organized in the genome in clusters and are genetically linked to loci that influence bitter taste perception of both mice and humans. The activation of the receptors within cells causes an increase in intracellular calcium ions which triggers the opening of potassium channels. The cell membrane becomes depolarized and the smooth muscle relaxes. The depolarization stimulates neurotransmitters that send sensory information to the brain. The information is processed in the brain and perceived as a specific taste.

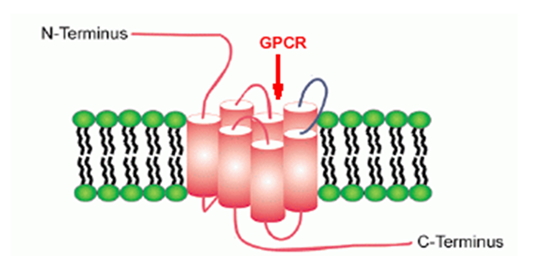
Basic GPCR structure consisting of a single polypeptide, an amino terminus and carboxyl end and 7 transmembrane segments.

== Structure ==
Most GPCRs consist of a single polypeptide with a globular tertiary shape and are made up of three general components: the extracellular domain, intracellular domain and the transmembrane domain. The extracellular domain includes the amino terminus and is composed of loops and helices that form binding pockets for ligands. Ligands bind to the receptors which causes activation.

The transmembrane domain consists of seven hydrophobic transmembrane segments. The segments are dispersed throughout the membrane. They transmit signals received from ligand binding at the extracellular domain to the intracellular domain.

The intracellular domain in the cytoplasm of the cell includes the carboxyl terminus and is where downstream signaling pathways are initiated as part of G-protein activation.

GPCR proteins range in size from 25-150 amino acids attached to the C- terminus and can be 80-480 Å in length.

== Biological importance ==
In mammals, bitter taste is used as a safety mechanism to prevent animals from eating toxic plants or animals. Bitter taste serves as a warning that a substance is potentially lethal. TAS2R10 is one of many bitter taste receptors that allows for the recognition of bitter taste. TAS2R10 receptors are able to detect many toxic substances such as strychnine.

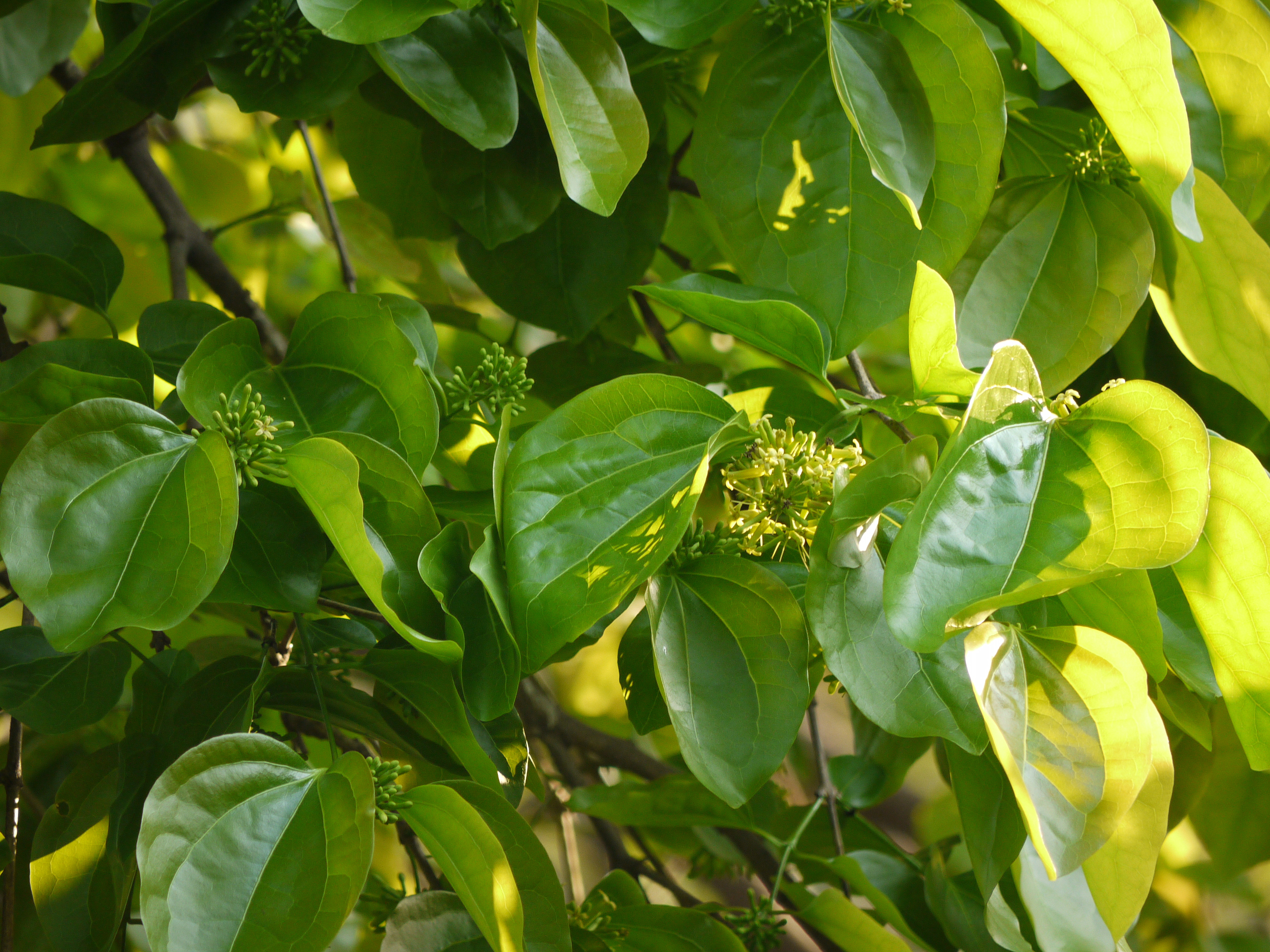
Strychnos nux-vomica plant. The seeds of the plant contain a poison called strychnine. Historically it has been used as a pesticide, and nervous system stimulant. Even small amounts are extremely toxic and can be lethal.

Strychnine is a naturally occurring poisonous alkaloid found in the seeds of trees in the Strychnos genus. Ingestion or exposure of strychnine can cause involuntary muscle contractions and spasms that can lead to death by asphyxiation when respiratory muscles are involved.

== Therapeutic use ==
A variety of research and studies are being conducted to investigate how taste receptors like TASR10 have additional functions beyond taste recognition. It is known that the activation of GPCR membrane proteins induces smooth muscle relaxation and vasodilation. This mechanism is being further studied in the hopes of developing potential treatments for vasoconstricting conditions such as asthma.

There is also research being down on how TASR receptors have a role in both regulatory functions in cancers and thyroid function regulation.

== See also ==
- Taste receptor
