= Methylthiouracil =

Chemical compound

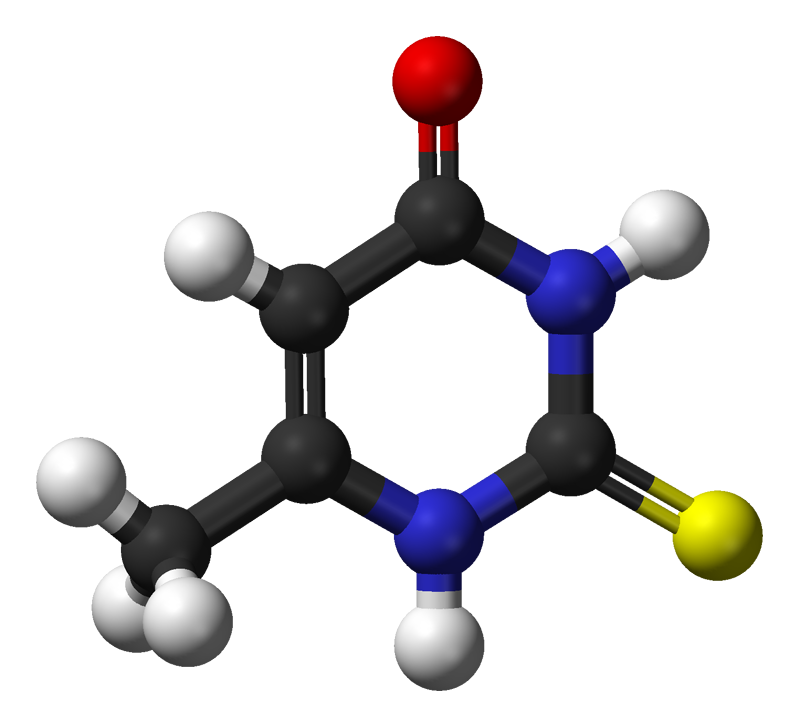

Clinical data
- AHFS/Drugs.com: International Drug Names
- ATC code: H03BA01 (WHO)

Identifiers
- IUPAC name: 6-methyl-2-thioxo-2,3-dihydropyrimidin-4(1H)-one
- CAS Number: 56-04-2
- PubChem CID: 667493
- ChemSpider: 580871
- UNII: QW24888U5F
- KEGG: C19265
- ChEMBL: ChEMBL1330588
- CompTox Dashboard (EPA): DTXSID2020890
- ECHA InfoCard: 100.000.230

Chemical and physical data
- Formula: C_{5}H_{6}N_{2}OS
- Molar mass: 142.18 g·mol^{−1}
- 3D model (JSmol): Interactive image
- SMILES: CC1=CC(=O)NC(=S)N1
- InChI: InChI=1S/C5H6N2OS/c1-3-2-4(8)7-5(9)6-3/h2H,1H3,(H2,6,7,8,9); Key:HWGBHCRJGXAGEU-UHFFFAOYSA-N

Methylthiouracil is an organosulfur compound that is used antithyroid preparation. It is a thioamide, closely related to propylthiouracil. Methylthiouracil is not used clinically in the United States, it has a similar mechanism of action and side effect to that of propylthiouricil. The drug acts to decrease the formation of stored thyroid hormone, as thyroglobulin in the thyroid gland. The clinical effects of the drug to treat the hyperthyroid state can have a lag period of up to two weeks, depending on the stores of thyroglobulin and other factors.

== Synthesis ==
Methylthiouracil synthesis:

Methylthiouracil is prepared quite simply by condensation of ethyl acetoacetate with thiourea.

Further work in this series shows that better activity was obtained by incorporation of a lipophilic side chain.
