= Dibromotyrosine =

Chemical compound

Clinical data
- ATC code: H03BX02 (WHO)

Identifiers
- IUPAC name: (2S)-2-Amino-3-(3,5-dibromo-4-hydroxyphenyl)propanoic acid
- CAS Number: 300-38-9
- PubChem CID: 67532
- ChemSpider: 60854
- UNII: QD49LEP46E
- ChEBI: CHEBI:28335
- ChEMBL: ChEMBL1232132
- CompTox Dashboard (EPA): DTXSID401015579
- ECHA InfoCard: 100.005.538

Chemical and physical data
- Formula: C_{9}H_{9}Br_{2}NO_{3}
- Molar mass: 338.983 g·mol^{−1}
- 3D model (JSmol): Interactive image
- SMILES: Brc1cc(cc(Br)c1O)C[C@@H](C(=O)O)N
- InChI: InChI=1S/C9H9Br2NO3/c10-5-1-4(2-6(11)8(5)13)3-7(12)9(14)15/h1-2,7,13H,3,12H2,(H,14,15)/t7-/m0/s1; Key:COESHZUDRKCEPA-ZETCQYMHSA-N

Dibromotyrosine is an antithyroid preparation and a derivative of the natural amino acid tyrosine.

It is formed by eosinophil peroxidase.
