= ATC code H03 =

ATC code H03 Thyroid therapy is a therapeutic subgroup of the Anatomical Therapeutic Chemical Classification System, a system of alphanumeric codes developed by the World Health Organization (WHO) for the classification of drugs and other medical products. Subgroup H03 is part of the anatomical group H Systemic hormonal preparations, excluding sex hormones and insulins.

Codes for veterinary use (ATCvet codes) can be created by placing the letter Q in front of the human ATC code: for example, QH03.
National versions of the ATC classification may include additional codes not present in this list, which follows the WHO version.

== H03A Thyroid preparations ==
=== H03AA Thyroid hormones ===
H03AA01 Levothyroxine sodium
H03AA02 Liothyronine sodium
H03AA03 Combinations of levothyroxine and liothyronine
H03AA04 Tiratricol
H03AA05 Thyroid gland preparations
H03AA51 Levothyroxine sodium and iodine compounds

== H03B Antithyroid preparations ==
=== H03BA Thiouracils ===
H03BA01 Methylthiouracil
H03BA02 Propylthiouracil
H03BA03 Benzylthiouracil

=== H03BB Sulphur-containing imidazole derivatives ===
H03BB01 Carbimazole
H03BB02 Thiamazole
H03BB52 Thiamazole, combinations

=== H03BC Perchlorates ===
H03BC01 Potassium perchlorate

=== H03BX Other antithyroid preparations ===
H03BX01 Diiodotyrosine
H03BX02 Dibromotyrosine
