= Linda Bartoshuk =

American psychologist (born 1938)

Linda May Bartoshuk
- Born: 1938 (age 87–88); Aberdeen, South Dakota
- Citizenship: United States
- Education: Carleton College (BA); Brown University (PhD)
- Known for: Supertaster; Burning Mouth Syndrome
- Scientific career
- Fields: Psychology, Taste, Smell
- Institutions: University of Florida

Linda May Bartoshuk (born 1938) is an American psychologist. She was born in rural South Dakota in 1938. She is a Presidential Endowed Professor of Community Dentistry and Behavioral Science at the University of Florida. She is an internationally known researcher specializing in the chemical senses of taste and smell, having discovered that some people are supertasters.

== Biography ==
Bartoshuk grew up in Aberdeen, South Dakota. She received her B.A. from Carleton College and her PhD from Brown University.

Her research explores the genetic variations in taste perception and how taste perception affects overall health. Bartoshuk was the first to discover that burning mouth syndrome, a condition predominantly experienced by postmenopausal women, is caused by damage to the taste buds at the front of the tongue and is not a psychosomatic condition. She was employed at Yale University prior to accepting a position at the University of Florida in 2005. Bartoshuk's work at Yale was funded through a series of NIH grants.

She was elected a Fellow of the American Academy of Arts and Sciences in 1995. In 2003, she was elected to the National Academy of Sciences.

== Selected works ==
- Bartoshuk, Linda M (June 1978). "The Psychophysics of Taste" (PDF). American Journal of Clinical Nutrition. 31 (6): 1068–1077. doi:10.1093/ajcn/31.6.1068. PMID 352127.
- Bartoshuk, Linda M, Dreyer, E., Klee, H.J., Odabasi, A.Z., Sims, C.A., Snyder, D.J., & Tieman, D.M. (2014). Mutant tomato varieties and the study of volatile-enhanced-sweetness. Paper presented at the Association for Chemoreception Sciences, 2014.
- Bartoshuk, L.M., Marino, S., Snyder, D.J., & Stamps, J. (2013, in press). Head trauma, taste damage and weight gain. Chemical Senses.
