= Antithyroid agent =

Hormone antagonist acting upon thyroid hormones

An antithyroid agent is a hormone inhibitor acting upon thyroid hormones.

The main antithyroid drugs are carbimazole (in the UK), methimazole (in the US), and propylthiouracil (PTU). A less common antithyroid agent is potassium perchlorate.

== Classification based on mechanisms of action ==
The mechanisms of action of antithyroid drugs are not completely understood. Based on their mechanisms of action, the drugs are classified into following six classes.

=== Thyroid hormone synthesis inhibitors ===
These drugs probably inhibit the enzyme thyroid peroxidase (a.k.a. thyroperoxidase), decreasing iodide oxidation, iodination of tyrosyl residues in thyroglobulin, and coupling of iodotyrosyl and iodothyronyl residues. It is thought that they inhibit the thyroperoxidase-catalyzed oxidation reactions by acting as substrates for the postulated peroxidase-iodine complex, thus competitively inhibiting the interaction with the amino acid tyrosine. The most common drugs in this class are thioamides, which include propylthiouracil, methimazole and its prodrug carbimazole.

Additionally, propylthiouracil may reduce the de-iodination of thyroxine (T_{4}) into triiodothyronine (T_{3}) in peripheral tissues.

Lugol's iodine is used to temporarily block thyroid hormone synthesis before surgeries. It is also used to treat patients with thyroid storm or, more commonly, to reduce thyroid vascularity before thyroidectomy (surgical removal of the thyroid gland).

=== Iodide uptake inhibitors ===
They decrease uptake of iodide ions (I^{−}) into follicular cells of the thyroid gland. Since their molecules have structural similarities with the iodide ion, they compete with iodide for being transported by the sodium/iodide symporter, which is a transporter protein that co-transports Na^{+} and I^{−} ions. Iodide transport is a key step in the biosynthesis of the thyroid hormones T4 and T3. For example, potassium perchlorate competitively inhibits the active iodide transport mechanism in the thyroid gland, which has the capacity to selectively concentrate iodide against a large concentration gradient.

Besides perchlorates, other examples of iodide uptake inhibitors include pertechnetates, thiocyanates, nitrates.

These drugs are no longer used due to high toxicity and adverse effects.

=== Thyroid hormone release inhibitors ===
They inhibit release (secretion) of thyroid hormones by the thyroid gland. The most studied drug in this class is lithium, which inhibits thyroid hormone secretion by inhibiting iodotyrosine coupling, thyroidal iodide uptake, and alteration in structure of thyroglobulin, a protein which acts as a substrate for the synthesis of thyroid hormones and storage of inactive forms of T3, T4 and iodine within the lumen of thyroid follicular cells. Since lithium is neither metabolized nor protein-bound, its bioavailability usually is close to 100%. Hence, there are risks of serious side effects such as lithium toxicity, hypothyroidism, and diabetes insipidus.

=== Excess iodine ===
Excessive iodine intake can temporarily inhibit production of thyroid hormones. This occurs because of the Wolff-Chaikoff effect, which is a phenomenon of rejection of large quantities of iodine by the thyroid gland, therefore preventing it from synthesizing large quantities of thyroid hormones.

=== Iodine radiopharmaceuticals ===
They are radioisotopes of iodine. In small doses, when they are taken up by overactive thyroid follicular cells, they emit small amounts of beta radiation that destroys not all, but many thyroid follicular cells, thereby reducing thyroid hormone production. This is a form of targeted therapy for hyperthyroidism. Since even low levels of ionizing radiation are highly mutagenic and can cause cancer, less toxic iodine isotopes such as iodine-123 are more commonly used in nuclear imaging, while iodine-131 is used for its cytolytic (cell-destroying) effects in hyperthyroidism and thyroid tumors.

=== Thyroid hormone receptor antagonists ===
Also called TR antagonists, they inhibit action of thyroid hormones by blocking TR receptors (thyroid hormone receptors). Antagonist 1-850 and its derivatives have been found to be coactivator interaction inhibitors, which interfere with the interaction between TR receptors and coactivator proteins such as nuclear hormone receptor coregulator (NRC). As a result, the receptors are unable to recruit coactivators, causing stoppage of transcription of target genes, thereby preventing activation of TR receptors, ultimately leading to inhibition of effects of thyroid hormones because they can bind to only inactive TR receptors, and these receptors can't be activated in presence of TR antagonists. Antagonist 1-850 has also been found to inhibit binding of [^{125}I]T3 (Note: [^{125}I]T3 is a radiopharmaceutical formulation of triiodothyronine having iodine-125 atoms instead of iodine.) to TRs in intact GH4 cells.

== Adverse effects ==
The most dangerous side effect is agranulocytosis (1/250, more in PTU); this is an idiosyncratic reaction which generally resolves on cessation of drug. It occurs in about 0.2 to 0.3% of cases treated with antithyroid drugs. Other side effects include granulocytopenia (dose dependent, which improves on cessation of the drug) and aplastic anemia, and in case of propylthiouracil, severe, fulminant liver failure. Patients on these medications should see a doctor if they develop sore throat or fever. Both methimazole and PTU are associated with drug-induced liver injury.

The most common side effects are rash and peripheral neuritis. These drugs also cross the placenta and are secreted in breast milk.

== Graves' disease ==
In Graves' disease, treatment with antithyroid medications must be given for six months to two years, in order to be effective. Even then, upon cessation of the drugs, the hyperthyroid state may recur. Side effects of the antithyroid medications include a potentially fatal reduction in the level of white blood cells.

A randomized control trial testing single dose treatment for Graves' found methimazole achieved euthyroidism (normal thyroid function that occurs within normal serum levels of TSH and T4) more effectively after 12 weeks than did propylthiouracil (77.1% on methimazole 15 mg vs 19.4% in the propylthiouracil 150 mg groups). But generally both drugs are considered equivalent.

A study has shown no difference in outcome for adding thyroxine to antithyroid medication and continuing thyroxine versus placebo after antithyroid medication withdrawal. However, two markers were found that can help predict the risk of recurrence. These two markers are an elevated level of thyroid stimulating hormone receptor antibodies (TSHR-Ab) and smoking. A positive TSHR-Ab at the end of antithyroid drug treatment increases the risk of recurrence to 90% (sensitivity 39%, specificity 98%), a negative TSHR-Ab at the end of antithyroid drug treatment is associated with a 78% chance of remaining in remission. Smoking was shown to have an impact independent to a positive TSHR-Ab.

Competitive antagonists of thyroid stimulating hormone receptors are currently being investigated as a possible treatment for Grave's disease.

== See also ==
- H03B code of antithyroid preparations
