= Umami peptide =

Family of amino acids linked to savoury taste

Umami peptides are a family of small to medium length polypeptides found in a variety of savoury foods, which impart an umami taste. They are best known from Asian condiments and foods such as soy sauce, fish sauce, oyster sauce, and miso, but are also found in a diverse range of other foods including cheese, stewed or preserved meat products, and Bolete mushrooms. One of the best characterised umami peptides is beefy meaty peptide, originally isolated from beef soup, an eight amino acid peptide with the sequence Lys-Gly-Asp-Glu-Glu-Ser-Leu-Ala which is thought to interact with the T1R1/T1R3 taste receptor complex.

There are dozens if not hundreds of umami peptides known, most of which have been little studied in isolation as they typically occur in complex mixtures, which can vary significantly between different foods, brands, and even different batches made the same way. Not all peptides isolated from such mixtures have umami flavour, with some closely related peptides tasting sweet, sour, salty, bitter or kokumi, and often a change in only a single amino acid can be enough to change the flavour entirely. However, the majority of peptides isolated from fermented foods or cooked or preserved meat products tend to have an umami flavour, with trace amounts of peptides with other flavours contributing to the overall flavour profile of the food.
