= Taste =

Sense of chemicals on the tongue

Taste bud

The gustatory system or sense of taste is the sensory system that is partially responsible for the perception of taste. Taste is the perception stimulated when a substance in the mouth reacts chemically with taste receptor cells located on taste buds in the oral cavity, mostly on the tongue. Taste, along with the sense of smell and trigeminal nerve stimulation (registering texture, pain, and temperature), determines flavors of food and other substances. Humans have taste receptors on taste buds and other areas, including the upper surface of the tongue and the epiglottis. The gustatory cortex is responsible for the perception of taste.

The tongue is covered with thousands of small bumps called papillae, which are visible to the naked eye. Within each papilla are hundreds of taste buds. The exceptions to this are the filiform papillae, which do not contain taste buds. There are between 2000 and 5000 taste buds that are located on the back and front of the tongue. Others are located on the roof, sides and back of the mouth, and in the throat. Each taste bud contains 50 to 100 taste receptor cells.

Taste receptors in the mouth sense the five basic tastes: sweetness, sourness, saltiness, bitterness, and savoriness (also known as savory or umami). Scientific experiments have demonstrated that these five tastes exist and are distinct from one another. Taste buds are able to tell different tastes apart when they interact with different molecules or ions. Sweetness, savoriness, and bitter tastes are triggered by the binding of molecules to G protein-coupled receptors on the cell membranes of taste buds. Saltiness and sourness are perceived when alkali metals or hydrogen ions meet taste buds, respectively.

The basic tastes contribute only partially to the sensation and flavor of food in the mouth—other factors include smell, detected by the olfactory epithelium of the nose; texture, detected through a variety of mechanoreceptors, muscle nerves, etc.; temperature, detected by temperature receptors; and "coolness" (such as of menthol) and "hotness" (pungency), by chemesthesis.

As the gustatory system senses both harmful and beneficial things, all basic tastes bring either caution or craving depending upon the effect the things they sense have on the body. Sweetness helps to identify energy-rich foods, while bitterness warns people of poisons.

Among humans, as taste perception begins to fade during ageing, tongue papillae are lost, and saliva production slowly decreases. Humans can also have distortion of tastes (dysgeusia). Not all mammals share the same tastes: some rodents can taste starch (which humans cannot), cats cannot taste sweetness, and several other carnivores, including hyenas, dolphins, and sea lions, have lost the ability to sense up to four of their ancestral five basic tastes.

== Basic tastes ==
The gustatory system allows animals to distinguish between safe and harmful food and to gauge different foods' nutritional value. Digestive enzymes in saliva begin to dissolve food into base chemicals that are washed over the papillae and detected as tastes by the taste buds. The tongue is covered with thousands of small bumps called papillae, which are visible to the naked eye. Within each papilla are hundreds of taste buds. The exception to this are the filiform papillae, which do not contain taste buds. There are between 2,000 and 5,000 taste buds that are located on the back and front of the tongue. Others are located on the roof, sides and back of the mouth, and in the throat. Each taste bud contains 50 to 100 taste-receptor cells.

The five specific tastes received by taste receptors are saltiness, sweetness, bitterness, sourness, and savoriness (often known by its Japanese name umami, which translates to 'deliciousness').

As of the early 20th century, Western physiologists and psychologists thought that there were four basic tastes: sweetness, sourness, saltiness, and bitterness. The concept of a "savory" taste was not present in Western science at that time, but was postulated in Japanese research.

One study found that salt and sour taste mechanisms both detect, in different ways, the presence of sodium chloride (salt) in the mouth. Acids are also detected and perceived as sour. The detection of salt is important to many organisms, but especially mammals, as it serves a critical role in ion and water homeostasis in the body. It is specifically needed in the mammalian kidney as an osmotically active compound that facilitates passive re-uptake of water into the blood. Because of this, salt elicits a pleasant taste in most humans, in certain concentrations.

Sour and salt tastes can be pleasant in small quantities, but in larger quantities become more and more unpleasant to taste. For sour taste, this presumably is because the sour taste can signal something is rotten or spoiled, which can be dangerous to the body because of bacteria that grow in such media. Additionally, sour taste signals acids, which can cause serious tissue damage.

Sweet taste signals the presence of carbohydrates in solution. Since carbohydrates have a very high calorie count (saccharides have many bonds, therefore much energy), they are essential to the human body, which evolved to seek out the high-calorie foods. They are used as direct energy (sugars) and storage of energy (glycogen). Many non-carbohydrate molecules trigger a sweet response, leading to the development of many artificial sweeteners, including saccharin, sucralose, and aspartame.

The savory taste (known in Japanese as umami), identified by Japanese chemist Kikunae Ikeda, signals the presence of the amino acid L-glutamate. The amino acids in proteins are used in the body to build muscles and organs, and to transport molecules (hemoglobin), antibodies, and the organic catalysts known as enzymes. These are all critical molecules, and it is important to have a steady supply of amino acids; consequently, savory tastes trigger a pleasurable response, encouraging the intake of peptides and proteins.

Pungency (piquancy or hotness) had traditionally been considered a sixth basic taste. In 2015, researchers suggested a new basic taste of fatty acids called "fat taste", although "oleogustus" and "pinguis" have both been proposed as alternate terms.

=== Sweetness ===
The diagram above depicts the signal transduction pathway of the sweet taste. Object A is a taste bud, object B is one taste cell of the taste bud, and object C is the neuron attached to the taste cell. I. Part I shows the reception of a molecule. 1. Sugar, the first messenger, binds to a protein receptor on the cell membrane. II. Part II shows the transduction of the relay molecules. 2. G Protein-coupled receptors, second messengers, are activated. 3. G Proteins activate adenylate cyclase, an enzyme, which increases the cAMP concentration. Depolarization occurs. 4. The energy, from step 3, is given to activate the K+, potassium, protein channels.III. Part III shows the response of the taste cell. 5. Ca+, calcium, protein channels is activated.6. The increased Ca+ concentration activates neurotransmitter vesicles. 7. The neuron connected to the taste bud is stimulated by the neurotransmitters.

Sweetness, usually regarded as a pleasurable sensation, is produced by the presence of sugars and substances that mimic sugar. Sweetness may be connected to aldehydes and ketones, which contain a carbonyl group. Sweetness is detected by a variety of G protein coupled receptors (GPCR) coupled to the G protein gustducin found on the taste buds. At least two different variants of the "sweetness receptors" must be activated for the brain to register sweetness. Compounds the brain senses as sweet are compounds that can bind with varying bond strength to two different sweetness receptors. These receptors are T1R2+3 (heterodimer) and T1R3 (homodimer), which account for all sweet sensing in humans and animals.

Taste detection thresholds for sweet substances are rated relative to sucrose, which has an index of 1. The average human detection threshold for sucrose is 10 millimoles per liter. For lactose it is 30 millimoles per liter, with a sweetness index of 0.3, and 5-nitro-2-propoxyaniline 0.002 millimoles per liter. "Natural" sweeteners such as saccharides activate the GPCR, which releases gustducin. The gustducin then activates the molecule adenylate cyclase, which catalyzes the production of the molecule cAMP, or adenosine 3', 5'-cyclic monophosphate. This molecule closes potassium ion channels, leading to depolarization and neurotransmitter release. Synthetic sweeteners such as saccharin activate different GPCRs and induce taste receptor cell depolarization by an alternate pathway.

=== Sourness ===
The diagram depicts the signal transduction pathway of the sour or salty taste. Object A is a taste bud, object B is a taste receptor cell within object A, and object C is the neuron attached to object B. I. Part I is the reception of hydrogen ions or sodium ions. 1. If the taste is sour, H^{+} ions, from acidic substances, pass through H^{+} channels. Depolarization takes place II. Part II is the transduction pathway of the relay molecules. 2. Cation, such as K^{+}, channels are opened. III. Part III is the response of the cell. 3. An influx of Ca^{+} ions is activated. 4. The Ca^{+} activates neurotransmitters. 5. A signal is sent to the neuron attached to the taste bud.

Sourness is the taste that describes acidity. The sourness of substances is rated relative to dilute hydrochloric acid, which has a sourness index of 1. By comparison, tartaric acid has a sourness index of 0.7, citric acid an index of 0.46, and carbonic acid an index of 0.06.

Sour taste is detected by a small subset of cells that are distributed across all taste buds called Type III taste receptor cells. H^{+} ions (protons) that are abundant in sour substances can directly enter the Type III taste cells through a proton channel. This channel was identified in 2018 as otopetrin 1 (OTOP1). The transfer of positive charge into the cell can itself trigger an electrical response. Some weak acids such as acetic acid can also penetrate taste cells; intracellular hydrogen ions inhibit potassium channels, which normally function to hyperpolarize the cell. By a combination of direct intake of hydrogen ions through OTOP1 ion channels (which itself depolarizes the cell) and the inhibition of the hyperpolarizing channel, sourness causes the taste cell to fire action potentials and release neurotransmitter.

The most common foods with natural sourness are fruits, such as lemon, lime, grape, orange, tamarind, and bitter melon. Fermented foods, such as wine, vinegar or yogurt, may have sour taste. Children show a greater enjoyment of sour flavors than adults, and sour candy containing citric acid or malic acid is common.

=== Saltiness ===
Saltiness taste seems to have two components: a low-salt signal and a high-salt signal. The low-salt signal causes a sensation of deliciousness, while the high-salt signal typically causes the sensation of "too salty".

The low-salt signal is understood to be caused by the epithelial sodium channel (ENaC), which is composed of three subunits. ENaC in the taste cells allow sodium cations to enter the cell. This on its own depolarizes the cell, and opens voltage-dependent calcium channels, flooding the cell with positive calcium ions and leading to neurotransmitter release. ENaC can be blocked by the drug amiloride in many mammals, especially rats. The sensitivity of the low-salt taste to amiloride in humans is much less pronounced, leading to conjecture that there may be additional low-salt receptors besides ENaC to be discovered.

A number of similar cations also trigger the low salt signal. The size of lithium and potassium ions most closely resemble those of sodium, and thus the saltiness is most similar. In contrast, rubidium and caesium ions are far larger, so their salty taste differs accordingly. The saltiness of substances is rated relative to sodium chloride (NaCl), which has an index of 1. Potassium, as potassium chloride (KCl), is the principal ingredient in salt substitutes and has a saltiness index of 0.6.

Other monovalent cations, e.g. ammonium (NH_{4}^{+}), and divalent cations of the alkali earth metal group of the periodic table, e.g. calcium (Ca^{2+}), ions generally elicit a bitter rather than a salty taste even though they, too, can pass directly through ion channels in the tongue, generating an action potential. But the chloride of calcium is saltier and less bitter than potassium chloride, and is commonly used in pickle brine instead of KCl.

The high-salt signal is poorly understood. This signal is not blocked by amiloride in rodents. Sour and bitter cells trigger on high chloride levels, but the specific receptor is unidentified.

=== Bitterness ===
The diagram depicted above shows the signal transduction pathway of the bitter taste. Bitter taste has many different receptors and signal transduction pathways. Object A is a taste bud, object B is one taste cell, and object C is a neuron attached to object B. I. Part I is the reception of a molecule.1. A bitter substance such as quinine, is consumed and binds to G protein-coupled receptors.II. Part II is the transduction pathway 2. Gustducin, a G protein second messenger, is activated. 3. Phosphodiesterase, an enzyme, is then activated. 4. Cyclic nucleotide, cNMP, is used, lowering the concentration 5. Channels such as the K+, potassium, channels, close. III. Part III is the response of the taste cell. 6. This leads to increased levels of Ca+. 7. The neurotransmitters are activated. 8. The signal is sent to the neuron.

Bitterness is one of the most sensitive of the tastes, and many perceive it as unpleasant, sharp, or disagreeable, but it is sometimes desirable and intentionally added via various bittering agents. Common bitter foods and beverages include coffee, unsweetened cocoa and chocolate, South American mate, coca tea, bitter gourd, uncured olives, citrus peel, some varieties of cheese, many plants in the family Brassicaceae, dandelion greens, horehound, wild chicory, and escarole. The ethanol in alcoholic beverages tastes bitter, as do the additional bitter ingredients found in some alcoholic beverages including hops in beer and gentian in bitters. Quinine is also known for its bitter taste and is found in tonic water.

Bitterness is of interest to those who study evolution, as well as various health researchers since a large number of natural bitter compounds are known to be toxic. The ability to detect bitter-tasting, toxic compounds at low thresholds is considered to provide an important protective function. Plant leaves often contain toxic compounds, and among leaf-eating primates there is a tendency to prefer immature leaves, which tend to be higher in protein and lower in fiber and poisons than mature leaves. Amongst humans, various food processing techniques are used worldwide to detoxify otherwise inedible foods and make them palatable. Furthermore, the use of fire, changes in diet, and avoidance of toxins has led to neutral evolution in human bitter sensitivity. This has allowed several loss of function mutations that has led to a reduced sensory capacity towards bitterness in humans when compared to other species.

The threshold for stimulation of bitter taste by quinine averages a concentration of 8 μM (8 micromolar). The taste thresholds of other bitter substances are rated relative to quinine, which is thus given a reference index of 1. For example, brucine has an index of 11, is thus perceived as intensely more bitter than quinine, and is detected at a much lower solution threshold. The most bitter natural substance is amarogentin, a compound present in the roots of the plant Gentiana lutea, and the most bitter substance known is the synthetic chemical denatonium, which has an index of 1,000. It is used as an aversive agent (a bitterant) that is added to toxic substances to prevent accidental ingestion. It was discovered accidentally in 1958 during research on a local anesthetic by T. & H. Smith of Edinburgh, Scotland.

Research has shown that TAS2Rs (taste receptors, type 2, also known as T2Rs) such as TAS2R38 coupled to the G protein gustducin are responsible for the human ability to taste bitter substances. They are identified not only by their ability to taste for certain "bitter" ligands, but also by the morphology of the receptor itself (surface bound, monomeric). The TAS2R family in humans is thought to comprise about 25 different taste receptors, some of which can recognize a wide variety of bitter-tasting compounds. Over 670 bitter-tasting compounds have been identified, on a bitter database, of which over 200 have been assigned to one or more specific receptors. It is speculated that the selective constraints on the TAS2R family have been weakened due to the relatively high rate of mutation and pseudogenization. Researchers use two synthetic substances, phenylthiocarbamide (PTC) and 6-n-propylthiouracil (PROP) to study the genetics of bitter perception. These two substances taste bitter to some people, but are virtually tasteless to others. Among the tasters, some are so-called "supertasters" to whom PTC and PROP are extremely bitter. The variation in sensitivity is determined by two common alleles at the TAS2R38 locus.

Gustducin is made of three subunits. When it is activated by the GPCR, its subunits break apart and activate phosphodiesterase, a nearby enzyme, which in turn converts a precursor within the cell into a secondary messenger, which closes potassium ion channels. Also, this secondary messenger can stimulate the endoplasmic reticulum to release Ca2+ which contributes to depolarization. This leads to a build-up of potassium ions in the cell, depolarization, and neurotransmitter release. It is also possible for some bitter tastants to interact directly with the G protein, because of a structural similarity to the relevant GPCR.

The most bitter substance known as of 2025 – oligoporin D – stimulates the bitter taste receptor type TAS2R46 at the lowest concentrations 100 nM (0.1 micromolar, approx. 63 millionths of a gram/liter).

=== Savoriness ===
Savoriness, or umami (Japanese: 旨味, meaning "good flavor"), is an appetitive taste commonly found in foods like tomatoes, meat, dashi and consommé. The term is conceptually similar to the French-derived word "savory." While it is considered fundamental to many East Asian cuisines, such as Japanese cuisine, the culinary use of umami-rich ingredients is ancient and global, tracing back to fermented fish sauces like garum in ancient Rome and ge-thcup (or koe-cheup) in ancient China.

Umami was first studied in 1907 by Ikeda isolating dashi taste, which he identified as the chemical monosodium glutamate (MSG). MSG is a sodium salt that produces a strong savory taste, especially combined with foods rich in nucleotides such as meats, fish, nuts, and mushrooms.

Some savory taste buds respond specifically to glutamate in the same way that "sweet" ones respond to sugar. Glutamate binds to a variant of G protein coupled glutamate receptors. L-glutamate may bond to a type of GPCR known as a metabotropic glutamate receptor (mGluR4) which causes the G-protein complex to activate the sensation of umami.

==== Perceptual independence from salty and sweet taste ====
There are doubts regarding whether umami is different from salty taste, as standalone glutamate (glutamic acid) without table salt ions (Na+), is perceived as sour, salt taste blockers reduce discrimination between monosodium glutamate and sucrose in rodents, since sweet and umami tastes share a taste receptor subunit; and part of the human population cannot tell apart umami from salty.

If umami does not have perceptual independence, it could be classified with other tastes like fat, carbohydrate, metallic, and calcium, which can be perceived at high concentrations but may not offer a prominent taste experience.

== Measuring relative tastes ==
Measuring the degree to which a substance presents one basic taste can be achieved in a subjective way by comparing its taste to a reference substance.

Sweetness is subjectively measured by comparing the threshold values, or level at which the presence of a dilute substance can be detected by a human taster, of different sweet substances. Substances are usually measured relative to sucrose, which is usually given an arbitrary index of 1 or 100. Rebaudioside A is 100 times sweeter than sucrose; fructose is about 1.4 times sweeter; glucose, a sugar found in honey and vegetables, is about three-quarters as sweet; and lactose, a milk sugar, is one-half as sweet.^{[b]}

The sourness of a substance can be rated by comparing it to very dilute hydrochloric acid (HCl).

Relative saltiness can be rated by comparison to a dilute salt solution.

Quinine, a bitter medicinal found in tonic water, can be used to subjectively rate the bitterness of a substance. Units of dilute quinine hydrochloride (1 g in 2000 mL of water) can be used to measure the threshold bitterness concentration, the level at which the presence of a dilute bitter substance can be detected by a human taster, of other compounds. More formal chemical analysis, while possible, is difficult.

There may not be an absolute measure for pungency, though there are tests for measuring the subjective presence of a given pungent substance in food, such as the Scoville scale for capsaicine in peppers or the Pyruvate scale for pyruvates in garlics and onions.

== Functional structure ==
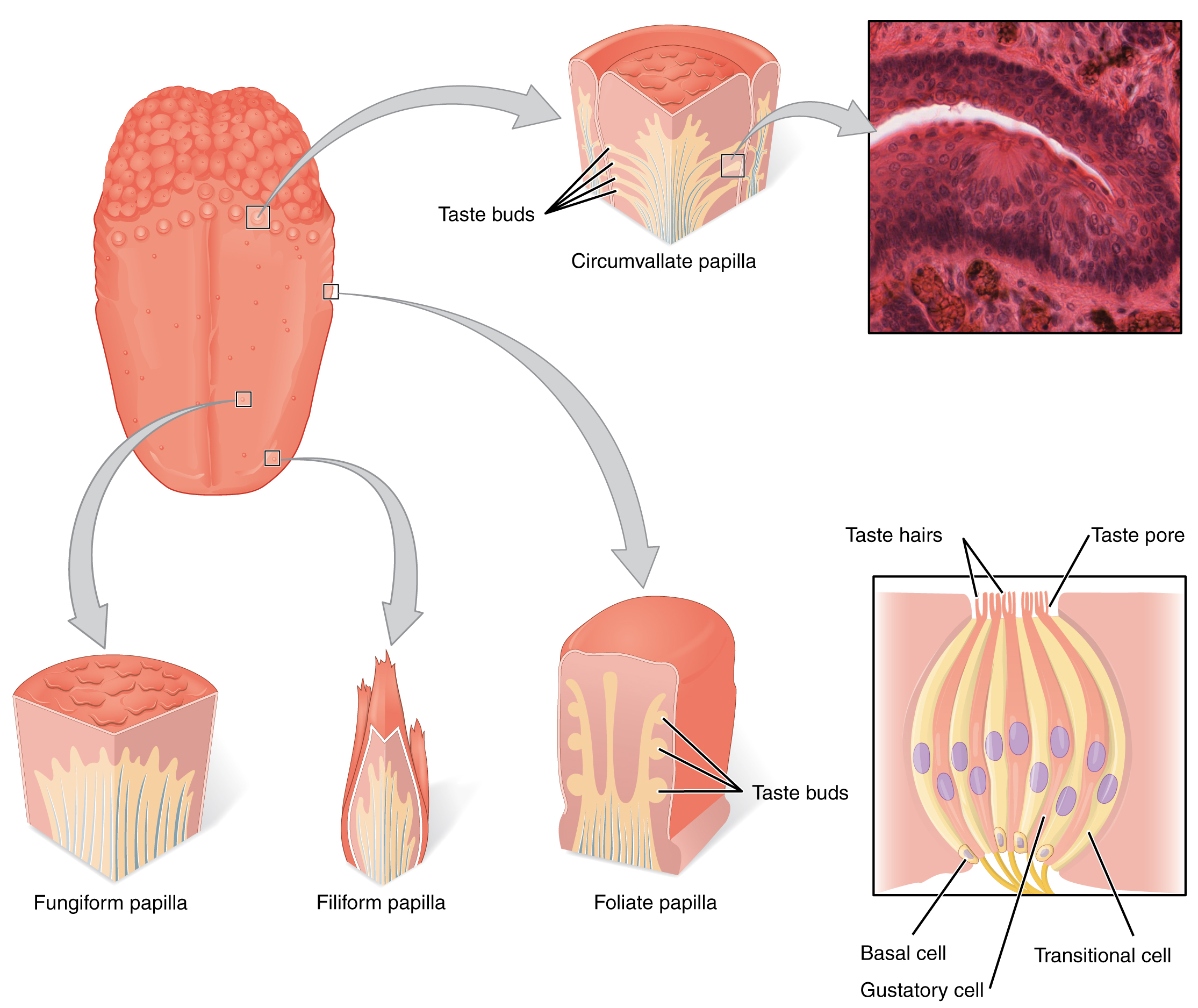
Taste buds and papillae of the human tongue

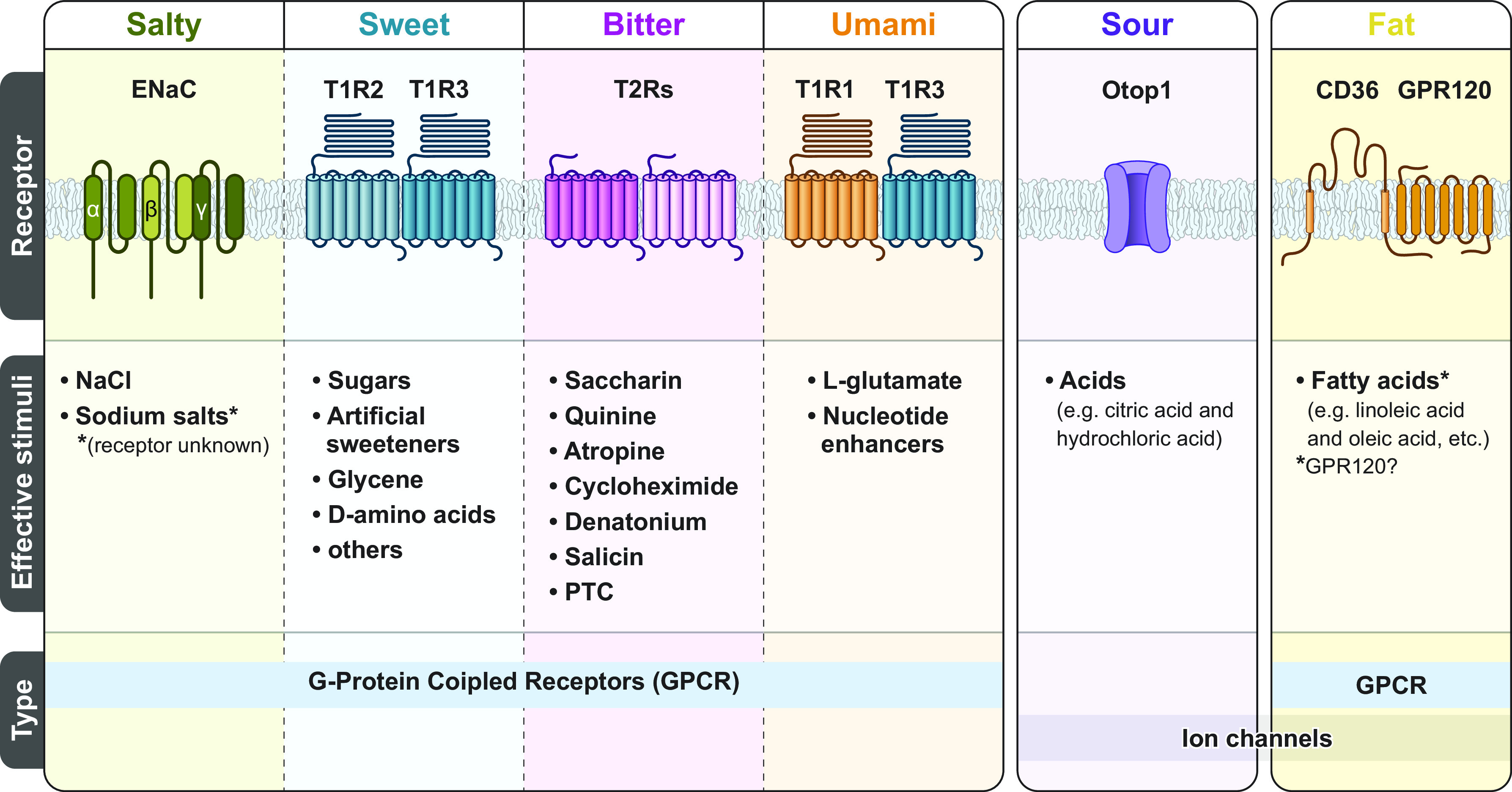
Taste receptors of the human tongue

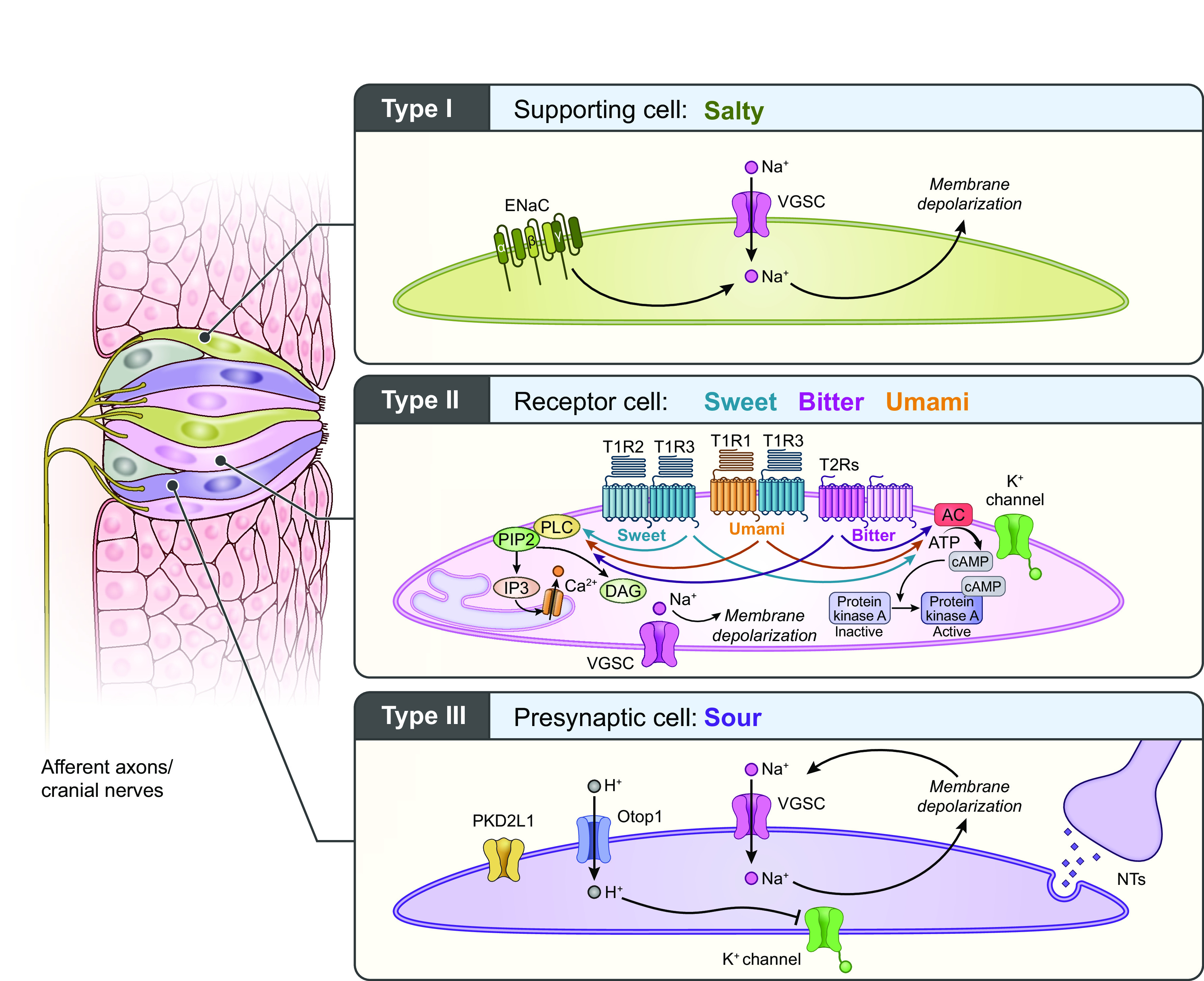
Signal transduction of taste receptors

Taste is a form of chemoreception which occurs in the specialised taste receptors in the mouth. To date, there are five different types of taste these receptors can detect which are recognized: salt, sweet, sour, bitter, and umami. Each type of receptor has a different manner of sensory transduction: that is, of detecting the presence of a certain compound and starting an action potential which alerts the brain. It is a matter of debate whether each taste cell is tuned to one specific tastant or to several; Smith and Margolskee claim that "gustatory neurons typically respond to more than one kind of stimulus, [a]lthough each neuron responds most strongly to one tastant". Researchers believe that the brain interprets complex tastes by examining patterns from a large set of neuron responses. This enables the body to make "keep or spit out" decisions when there is more than one tastant present. "No single neuron type alone is capable of discriminating among stimuli or different qualities, because a given cell can respond the same way to disparate stimuli." As well, serotonin is thought to act as an intermediary hormone which communicates with taste cells within a taste bud, mediating the signals being sent to the brain. Receptor molecules are found on the top of microvilli of the taste cells.

=== Sweetness ===
Sweetness is produced by the presence of sugars, some proteins, and other substances such as alcohols like anethol, glycerol and propylene glycol, saponins such as glycyrrhizin, artificial sweeteners (organic compounds with a variety of structures), and lead compounds such as lead acetate. It is often connected to aldehydes and ketones, which contain a carbonyl group. Many foods can be perceived as sweet regardless of their actual sugar content. For example, some plants such as liquorice, anise or stevia can be used as sweeteners. Rebaudioside A is a steviol glycoside coming from stevia that is 200 times sweeter than sugar. Lead acetate and other lead compounds were used as sweeteners, mostly for wine, until lead poisoning became known. Romans used to deliberately boil the must inside of lead vessels to make a sweeter wine. Sweetness is detected by a variety of G protein-coupled receptors coupled to a G protein that acts as an intermediary in the communication between taste bud and brain, gustducin. These receptors are T1R2+3 (heterodimer) and T1R3 (homodimer), which account for sweet sensing in humans and other animals.

=== Saltiness ===
Saltiness is a taste produced best by the presence of cations (such as Na^{+}, K^{+} or Li^{+}) and is directly detected by cation influx into glial like cells via leak channels causing depolarisation of the cell.

=== Sourness ===
Sourness is acidity, and, like salt, it is a taste sensed using ion channels. Undissociated acid diffuses across the plasma membrane of a presynaptic cell, where it dissociates in accordance with Le Chatelier's principle. The protons that are released then block potassium channels, which depolarise the cell and cause calcium influx. In addition, the taste receptor PKD2L1 has been found to be involved in tasting sour.

=== Bitterness ===
Research has shown that TAS2Rs (taste receptors, type 2, also known as T2Rs) such as TAS2R38 are responsible for the ability to taste bitter substances in vertebrates. They are identified not only by their ability to taste certain bitter ligands, but also by the morphology of the receptor itself (surface bound, monomeric).

=== Savoriness ===
The amino acid glutamic acid is responsible for savoriness, but some nucleotides (inosinic acid and guanylic acid) can act as complements, enhancing the taste.

Glutamic acid binds to a variant of the G protein-coupled receptor, producing a savory taste.

== Further sensations and transmission ==
The tongue can also feel other sensations not generally included in the basic tastes. These are largely detected by the somatosensory system. In humans, the sense of taste is conveyed via three of the twelve cranial nerves. The facial nerve (VII) carries taste sensations from the anterior two thirds of the tongue, the glossopharyngeal nerve (IX) carries taste sensations from the posterior one third of the tongue while a branch of the vagus nerve (X) carries some taste sensations from the back of the oral cavity.

The trigeminal nerve (cranial nerve V) provides information concerning the general texture of food as well as the taste-related sensations of peppery or hot (from spices).

=== Pungency (also spiciness or hotness) ===
Substances such as ethanol and capsaicin cause a burning sensation by inducing a trigeminal nerve reaction together with normal taste reception. The sensation of heat is caused by the food's activating nerves that express TRPV1 and TRPA1 receptors. Some such plant-derived compounds that provide this sensation are capsaicin from chili peppers, piperine from black pepper, gingerol from ginger root and allyl isothiocyanate from horseradish. The piquant ("hot" or "spicy") sensation provided by such foods and spices plays an important role in a diverse range of cuisines across the world—especially in equatorial and sub-tropical climates, such as Ethiopian, Peruvian, Hungarian, Indian, Korean, Indonesian, Lao, Malaysian, Mexican, New Mexican, Pakistani, Singaporean, Southwest Chinese (including Sichuan cuisine), Vietnamese, and Thai cuisines.

This particular sensation, called chemesthesis, is not a taste in the technical sense, because the sensation does not arise from taste buds, and a different set of nerve fibers carry it to the brain. Foods like chili peppers activate nerve fibers directly; the sensation interpreted as "hot" results from the stimulation of somatosensory (pain/temperature) fibers on the tongue. Many parts of the body with exposed membranes but no taste sensors (such as the nasal cavity, under the fingernails, surface of the eye or a wound) produce a similar sensation of heat when exposed to hotness agents.

=== Coolness ===
Some substances activate cold trigeminal receptors even when not at low temperatures. This "fresh" or "minty" sensation can be tasted in peppermint and spearmint and is triggered by substances such as menthol, anethol, ethanol, and camphor. Caused by activation of the same mechanism that signals cold, TRPM8 ion channels on nerve cells, unlike the actual change in temperature described for sugar substitutes, this coolness is only a perceived phenomenon.

=== Numbness ===
Both Chinese and Batak Toba cooking include the idea of 麻 (má) or mati rasa, a tingling numbness caused by spices such as Sichuan pepper. The cuisines of Sichuan province in China and of the Indonesian province of North Sumatra often combine this with chili pepper to produce a 麻辣 málà, "numbing-and-hot", or "mati rasa" flavor. Typical in northern Brazilian cuisine, jambu is an herb used in dishes like tacacá. These sensations, although not taste, fall into a category of chemesthesis.

=== Astringency ===
Some foods, such as unripe fruits, contain tannins or calcium oxalate that cause an astringent or puckering sensation of the mucous membrane of the mouth. Examples include tea, red wine, or rhubarb. Other terms for the astringent sensation are "dry", "rough", "harsh" (especially for wine), "tart" (normally referring to sourness), "rubbery", "hard" or "styptic".

=== Metallicness ===
A metallic taste may be caused by food and drink, certain medicines or amalgam dental fillings. It is generally considered an off flavor when present in food and drink. A metallic taste may be caused by galvanic reactions in the mouth. In the case where it is caused by dental work, the dissimilar metals used may produce a measurable current. Some artificial sweeteners are perceived to have a metallic taste, which is detected by the TRPV1 receptors. Many people consider blood to have a metallic taste. A metallic taste in the mouth is also a symptom of various medical conditions, in which case it may be classified under the symptoms dysgeusia or parageusia, referring to distortions of the sense of taste, and can be caused by medication, including saquinavir, zonisamide, and various kinds of chemotherapy, as well as occupational hazards, such as working with pesticides.

=== Fat taste ===
Recent research reveals a potential taste receptor called the CD36 receptor. CD36 was targeted as a possible lipid taste receptor because it binds to fat molecules (more specifically, long-chain fatty acids), and it has been localized to taste bud cells (specifically, the circumvallate and foliate papillae). There is a debate over whether we can truly taste fats, and supporters of human ability to taste free fatty acids (FFAs) have based the argument on a few main points: there is an evolutionary advantage to oral fat detection; a potential fat receptor has been located on taste bud cells; fatty acids evoke specific responses that activate gustatory neurons, similar to other currently accepted tastes; and, there is a physiological response to the presence of oral fat. Although CD36 has been studied primarily in mice, research examining human subjects' ability to taste fats found that those with high levels of CD36 expression were more sensitive to tasting fat than were those with low levels of CD36 expression; this study points to a clear association between CD36 receptor quantity and the ability to taste fat.

Other possible fat taste receptors have been identified. G protein-coupled receptors free fatty acid receptor 4 (also termed GPR120) and to a much lesser extent Free fatty acid receptor 1 (also termed GPR40) have been linked to fat taste, because their absence resulted in reduced preference to two types of fatty acid (linoleic acid and oleic acid), as well as decreased neuronal response to oral fatty acids.

Monovalent cation channel TRPM5 has been implicated in fat taste as well, but it is thought to be involved primarily in downstream processing of the taste rather than primary reception, as it is with other tastes such as bitter, sweet, and savory.

Proposed alternate names to fat taste include oleogustus and pinguis, although these terms are not widely accepted. The main form of fat that is commonly ingested is triglycerides, which are composed of three fatty acids bound together. In this state, triglycerides are able to give fatty foods unique textures that are often described as creaminess. But this texture is not an actual taste. It is only during ingestion that the fatty acids that make up triglycerides are hydrolysed into fatty acids via lipases. The taste is commonly related to other, more negative, tastes such as bitter and sour due to how unpleasant the taste is for humans. Richard Mattes, a co-author of the study, explained that low concentrations of these fatty acids can create an overall better flavor in a food, much like how small uses of bitterness can make certain foods more rounded. A high concentration of fatty acids in certain foods is generally considered inedible. To demonstrate that individuals can distinguish fat taste from other tastes, the researchers separated volunteers into groups and had them try samples that also contained the other basic tastes. Volunteers were able to separate the taste of fatty acids into their own category, with some overlap with savory samples, which the researchers hypothesized was due to poor familiarity with both. The researchers note that the usual "creaminess and viscosity we associate with fatty foods is largely due to triglycerides", unrelated to the taste; while the actual taste of fatty acids is not pleasant. Mattes described the taste as "more of a warning system" that a certain food should not be eaten.

There are few regularly consumed foods rich in fat taste, due to the negative flavor that is evoked in large quantities. Foods whose flavor to which fat taste makes a small contribution include olive oil and fresh butter, along with various kinds of vegetable and nut oils.

=== Heartiness ===
Kokumi (/koʊkuːmi/, Japanese: kokumi (コク味) from koku (こく)) is translated as "heartiness", "full flavor" or "rich" and describes compounds in food that do not have their own taste, but enhance the taste of other compounds.

Alongside the five basic tastes of sweet, sour, salt, bitter and savory, kokumi has been described as something that may enhance the other five tastes by magnifying and lengthening the other tastes, or "mouthfulness". Garlic is a common ingredient to add flavor used to help define the characteristic kokumi flavors.

Calcium-sensing receptors (CaSR) are receptors for kokumi substances which, applied around taste pores, induce an increase in the intracellular Ca concentration in a subset of cells. This subset of CaSR-expressing taste cells are independent from the influenced basic taste receptor cells. CaSR agonists directly activate the CaSR on the surface of taste cells and integrated in the brain via the central nervous system. A basal level of calcium, corresponding to the physiological concentration, is necessary for activation of the CaSR to develop the kokumi sensation.

=== Calcium ===
The distinctive taste of chalk has been identified as the calcium component of that substance. In 2008, geneticists discovered a calcium receptor on the tongues of mice. The CaSR receptor is commonly found in the gastrointestinal tract, kidneys, and brain. Along with the "sweet" T1R3 receptor, the CaSR receptor can detect calcium as a taste. Whether the perception exists or not in humans is unknown.

=== Temperature ===
Temperature can be an essential element of the taste experience. Heat can accentuate some flavors and decrease others by varying the density and phase equilibrium of a substance. Food and drink that—in a given culture—is traditionally served hot is often considered distasteful if cold, and vice versa. For example, alcoholic beverages, with a few exceptions, are usually thought best when served at room temperature or chilled to varying degrees, but soups—again, with exceptions—are usually only eaten hot. A cultural example are soft drinks. In North America, they are almost always preferred cold, regardless of season.

=== Starchiness ===
A 2016 study suggested that humans can taste starch (specifically, a glucose oligomer) independently of other tastes such as sweetness, without suggesting an associated chemical receptor.

== Neuroscience of taste ==
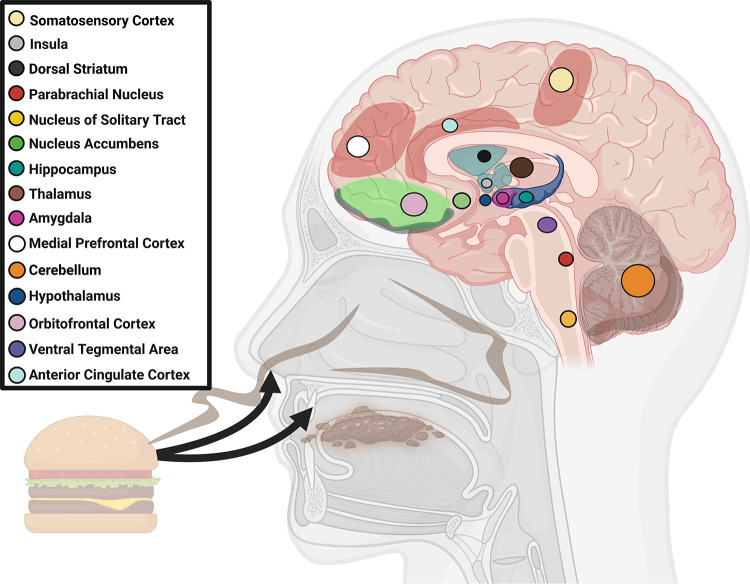
Active brain areas in taste perception

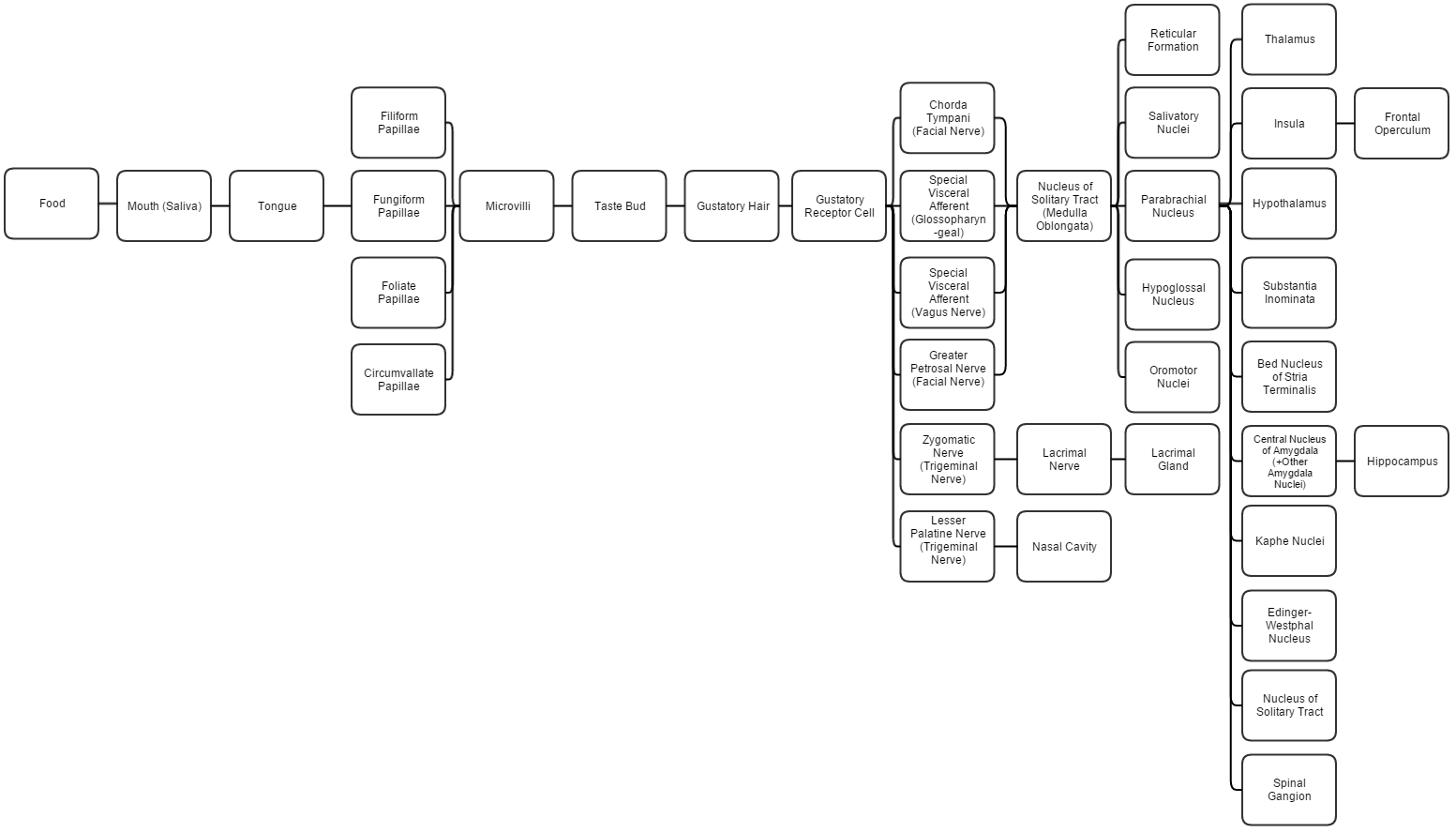
This diagram linearly (unless otherwise mentioned) tracks the projections of all known structures that allow for taste to their relevant endpoints in the human brain.

The glossopharyngeal nerve innervates a third of the tongue including the circumvallate papillae. The facial nerve innervates the other two thirds of the tongue and the cheek via the chorda tympani.

The pterygopalatine ganglia are ganglia (one on each side) of the soft palate. The greater petrosal, lesser palatine and zygomatic nerves all synapse here. The greater petrosal carries soft palate taste signals to the facial nerve. The lesser palatine sends signals to the nasal cavity, which is why spicy foods cause nasal drip. The zygomatic sends signals to the lacrimal nerve that activate the lacrimal gland, which is the reason that spicy foods can cause tears. Both the lesser palatine and the zygomatic are maxillary nerves (from the trigeminal nerve).

The special visceral afferents of the vagus nerve carry taste from the epiglottal region of the tongue.

The lingual nerve (trigeminal, not shown in diagram) is deeply interconnected with the chorda tympani in that it provides all other sensory info from the anterior two-thirds of the tongue. This info is processed separately (nearby) in the rostral lateral subdivision of the nucleus of the solitary tract (NST).

The NST receives input from the amygdala (regulates oculomotor nuclei output), bed nuclei of stria terminalis, hypothalamus, and prefrontal cortex. The NST is the topographical map that processes gustatory and sensory (temp, texture, etc.) info.

The reticular formation (includes Raphe nuclei responsible for serotonin production) is signaled to release serotonin during and after a meal to suppress appetite. Similarly, salivary nuclei are signaled to decrease saliva secretion.

Hypoglossal and thalamic connections aid in oral-related movements.

Hypothalamus connections hormonally regulate hunger and the digestive system.

Substantia innominata connects the thalamus, temporal lobe, and insula.

Edinger-Westphal nucleus reacts to taste stimuli by dilating and constricting the pupils.

Spinal ganglia are involved in movement.

The frontal operculum is speculated to be the memory and association hub for taste.

The insula cortex aids in swallowing and gastric motility.

== Taste in insects ==
Insects taste using small hair-like structures called taste sensilla, specialized sensory organs located on various body parts such as the mouthparts, legs, and wings. These sensilla contain gustatory receptor neurons (GRNs) sensitive to a wide range of chemical stimuli.

Insects respond to sugar, bitter, acid, and salt tastes. However, their taste spectrum extends to include water, fatty acids, metals, carbonation, RNA, ATP, and pheromones. Detecting these substances is vital for behaviors like feeding, mating, and oviposition.

Invertebrates' ability to taste these compounds is fundamental to their survival and provides insights into the evolution of sensory systems. This knowledge is crucial for understanding insect behavior and has applications in pest control and pollination biology.

== Other concepts ==
=== Supertasters ===
A supertaster is a person whose sense of taste is significantly more sensitive than most. The cause of this heightened response is likely, at least in part, due to an increased number of fungiform papillae. Studies have shown that supertasters require less fat and sugar in their food to get the same satisfying effects. These people tend to consume more salt than others. This is due to their heightened sense of the taste of bitterness, and the presence of salt drowns out the taste of bitterness.

=== Aftertaste ===
Aftertastes arise after food has been swallowed. An aftertaste can differ from the food it follows. Medicines and tablets may also have a lingering aftertaste, as they can contain certain artificial flavor compounds, such as aspartame (artificial sweetener).

=== Acquired taste ===
An acquired taste often refers to an appreciation for a food or beverage that is unlikely to be enjoyed by a person who has not had substantial exposure to it, usually because of some unfamiliar aspect of the food or beverage, including bitterness, a strong or strange odor, taste, or appearance.

== Clinical significance ==
Patients with Addison's disease, pituitary insufficiency, or cystic fibrosis sometimes have a hyper-sensitivity to the five primary tastes.

=== Disorders of taste ===
- ageusia (complete loss of taste)
- hypogeusia (reduced sense of taste)
- dysgeusia (distortion in sense of taste)
- hypergeusia (abnormally heightened sense of taste)

Viruses can also cause loss of taste. About 50% of patients with SARS-CoV-2 (causing COVID-19) experience some type of disorder associated with their sense of smell or taste, including ageusia and dysgeusia. SARS-CoV-1, MERS-CoV and even the flu (influenza virus) can also disrupt olfaction.

== History ==
In the West, Aristotle postulated in c. 350 BC that the two most basic tastes were sweet and bitter. He was one of the first persons to develop a list of basic tastes.

== Research ==
The receptors for the basic tastes of bitter, sweet and savory have been identified. They are G protein-coupled receptors. The cells that detect sourness have been identified as a subpopulation that express the protein PKD2L1, and The responses are mediated by an influx of protons into the cells. As of 2019, molecular mechanisms for each taste appear to be different, although all taste perception relies on activation of P2X purinoreceptors on sensory nerves.

== See also ==
- Beefy meaty peptide
- Digital lollipop
- Gustatory nucleus
- Optimal foraging theory
- Palatability
- Mouthfeel
- Neurogastronomy
- Vomeronasal organ
- Sensory analysis
- Tea tasting
- Wine tasting

== Notes ==
a. It has been known for some time that these categories may not be comprehensive. In Guyton's 1976 edition of Textbook of Medical Physiology, he wrote:

On the basis of physiologic studies, there are generally believed to be at least four primary sensations of taste: sour, salty, sweet, and bitter. Yet we know that a person can perceive literally hundreds of different tastes. These are all supposed to be combinations of the four primary sensations...However, there might be other less conspicuous classes or subclasses of primary sensations",

b. Some variation in values is not uncommon between various studies. Such variations may arise from a range of methodological variables, from sampling to analysis and interpretation. In fact there is a "plethora of methods" Indeed, the taste index of 1, assigned to reference substances such as sucrose (for sweetness), hydrochloric acid (for sourness), quinine (for bitterness), and sodium chloride (for saltiness), is itself arbitrary for practical purposes.

Some values, such as those for maltose and glucose, vary little. Others, such as aspartame and sodium saccharin, have much larger variation. Regardless of variation, the perceived intensity of substances relative to each reference substance remains consistent for taste ranking purposes. The indices table for McLaughlin & Margolskee (1994) for example, is essentially the same as that of Svrivastava & Rastogi (2003), Guyton & Hall (2006), and Joesten et al. (2007). The rankings are all the same, with any differences, where they exist, being in the values assigned from the studies from which they derive.

As for the assignment of 1 or 100 to the index substances, this makes no difference to the rankings themselves, only to whether the values are displayed as whole numbers or decimal points. Glucose remains about three-quarters as sweet as sucrose whether displayed as 75 or 0.75.
