= Taster (genetics) =

A taster is a person, by means of a human genotype, who is able to taste phenylthiocarbamide (PTC) and its derivative 6-n-propylthiouracil (PROP). PTC tastes bitter to many people (tasters) but is tasteless to others (non-tasters).

About 70% of Caucasians from North America and Western Europe are tasters. The other 30% are non-tasters. Worldwide, fewer Black and Asian persons are non-tasters, and about 50% of indigenous persons from India are non-tasters.

== See also ==
- PTC tasting
