= BTU (disambiguation) =

BTU is an acronym referring to the British thermal unit

BTU may also refer to:

- Bathurst Trade Union, the first trade union organization in Bathurst in The Gambia
- Benzylthiouracil, a pharmaceutical compound
- Board of Trade unit, an obsolete British term for the kilowatt hour
- "BT-U", a track on the John Abercrombie album, Speak of the Devil (John Abercrombie album)
- Peabody Energy Corporation, NYSE ticker symbol BTU
- IATA code for Bintulu Airport
- Brandenburg University of Technology, Brandenburgische Technische Universität, a technical school in Cottbus, Germany
- Bursa Technical University, Bursa Teknik Üniversitesi, a university which is located in Bursa, Turkey
- BTU, a collaborative music group with solo musicians Barney Bentall, Tom Taylor, and Shari Ulrich
