= Supertaster =

Person with an elevated taste response

Supertasters are individuals whose sense of taste for certain flavors and foods is far more sensitive than the average person. The term originated with experimental psychologist Linda Bartoshuk and is not the result of response bias or a scaling artifact but appears to have an anatomical or biological basis.

Over the past two decades, the study of many differences in oral sensation has grown to encompass the idea of supertasting. Originally identified as the heightened response to the suprathreshold bitterness of concentrated propylthiouracil (PROP), the contemporary view supports that supertasting encompasses an elevated response to all taste qualities.

== Discovery ==
Reports of variations in human taste perception date back to 1888. The major advance in understanding human taste variation came in 1931 with the discovery of "taste-blindness" specifically for thiourea compounds, when Arthur L. Fox, a chemist at DuPont, discovered that some people found phenylthiocarbamide (PTC) bitter, while others found it tasteless.

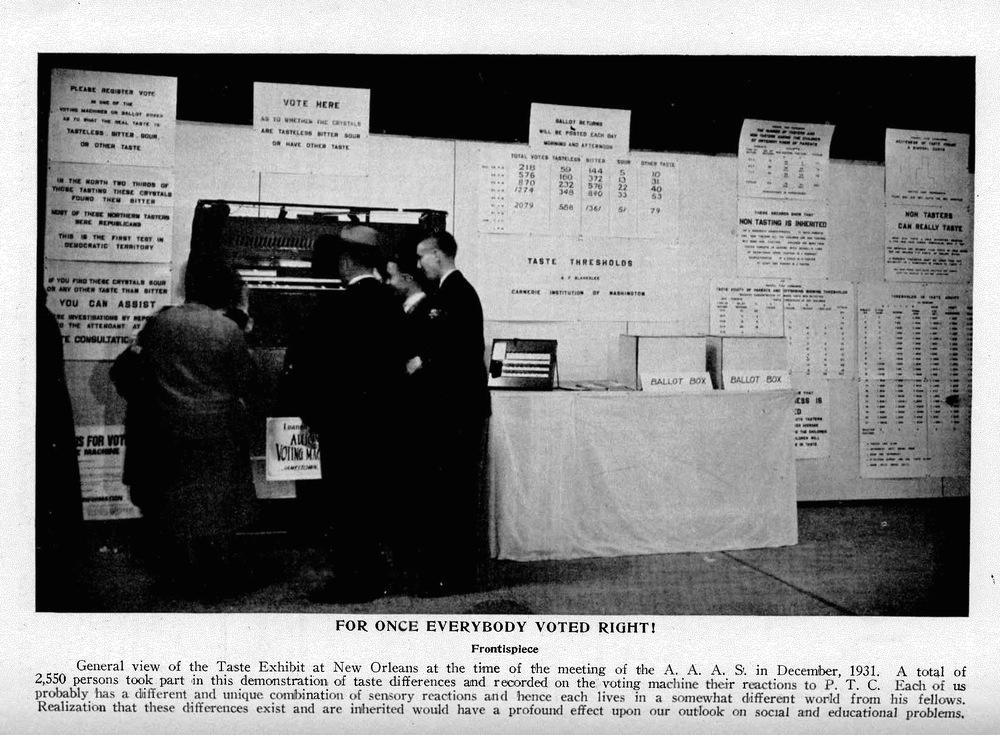
Taste Exhibit at the 1931 AAAS meeting. Visitors were invited to "try this harmless substance and learn whether you are a taster or a non-taster."

Fox describes the event:

Some time ago the author [Arthur L. Fox] had occasion to prepare a quantity of phenyl-thio-carbamide, and while placing it in a bottle the dust flew around in the air. Another occupant of the laboratory, Dr. C. R. Noller, complained of the bitter taste of the dust, but the author, who was much closer, observed no taste and so stated. He even tasted some of the crystals and assured Dr. Noller they were tasteless but Dr. Noller was equally certain it was the dust he tasted. He tried some of the crystals and found them extremely bitter.

At the 1931 American Association for the Advancement of Science (AAAS) meeting, Fox collaborated with Albert F. Blakeslee, a geneticist, to have participants taste PTC: 65% found it bitter, 28% found it tasteless, and 6% described other taste qualities. Subsequent studies established that the ability to taste PTC was heritable (Mendelian dominant), indicating a genetic component to taste sensitivity.

In the 1960s, Roland Fischer was the first to link the ability to taste PTC, and the related compound propylthiouracil (PROP) to food preference, diet, and calorie intake. Today, PROP has replaced PTC for research because of a faint sulfurous odor and safety concerns with PTC. In the 1990s Linda Bartoshuk and colleagues discovered that the taster group could be further divided into medium tasters and supertasters. Research suggests 25% of the population are non-tasters, 50% are medium tasters, and 25% are supertasters.

As a result of hundreds of studies exploring the detection threshold variation in taste sensitivity, the ability to taste the bitter compound phenylthiocarbamide (PTC) has become one of the best-known Mendelian traits in human populations, ranking alongside eye color and blood type in the canon of classic examples.

== Cause ==
In 2003, a significant breakthrough occurred when allelic variation in the bitter receptor gene TAS2R38 was identified as the molecular basis for differences in PTC detection thresholds. This gene encodes a receptor on the tongue that binds to bitter compounds, influencing how strongly an individual perceives the taste of these substances. The discovery of TAS2R38's role in taste perception was quickly extended to include sensitivity to propylthiouracil (PROP). Associations between TAS2R38 and the number of fungiform papillae (FP) were suspected. However, a causal relationship with the supertaster phenomenon has not been established.

Molecular genetics indicate that TAS2R38 alleles cannot explain supertasting. This seems intuitive, as polymorphisms in a specific bitter receptor gene are unlikely to account for heightened responses across multiple taste qualities, oral somatosensation, and retronasal olfaction.

In addition, environmental causes may play a role in sensitive taste. The exact mechanisms by which these causes may manifest, as well as possible evolutionary advantages to elevated taste sensitivity, are still unknown. No clearcut benefit to the trait has been established: in some environments a heightened taste response, particularly to bitterness, would represent an important advantage in avoiding potentially toxic plant alkaloids; however, an increased response to bitterness may limit approach behavior for various palatable foods.

Moreover, the TAS2R38 genotype has been linked to a preference for sweetness in children, avoidance of alcoholic beverages, increased prevalence of colon cancer (because of inadequate vegetable consumption), and avoidance of cigarette smoking.

== Prevalence ==
=== Women ===
Women are more likely to be supertasters, as are those from Asia, South America, and Africa. Female supertasters tend to have a lower body mass index and better cardiovascular health. This could be because supertasters may not have a high predilection for sweet or high-fat foods compared to the average person.

=== Identification ===
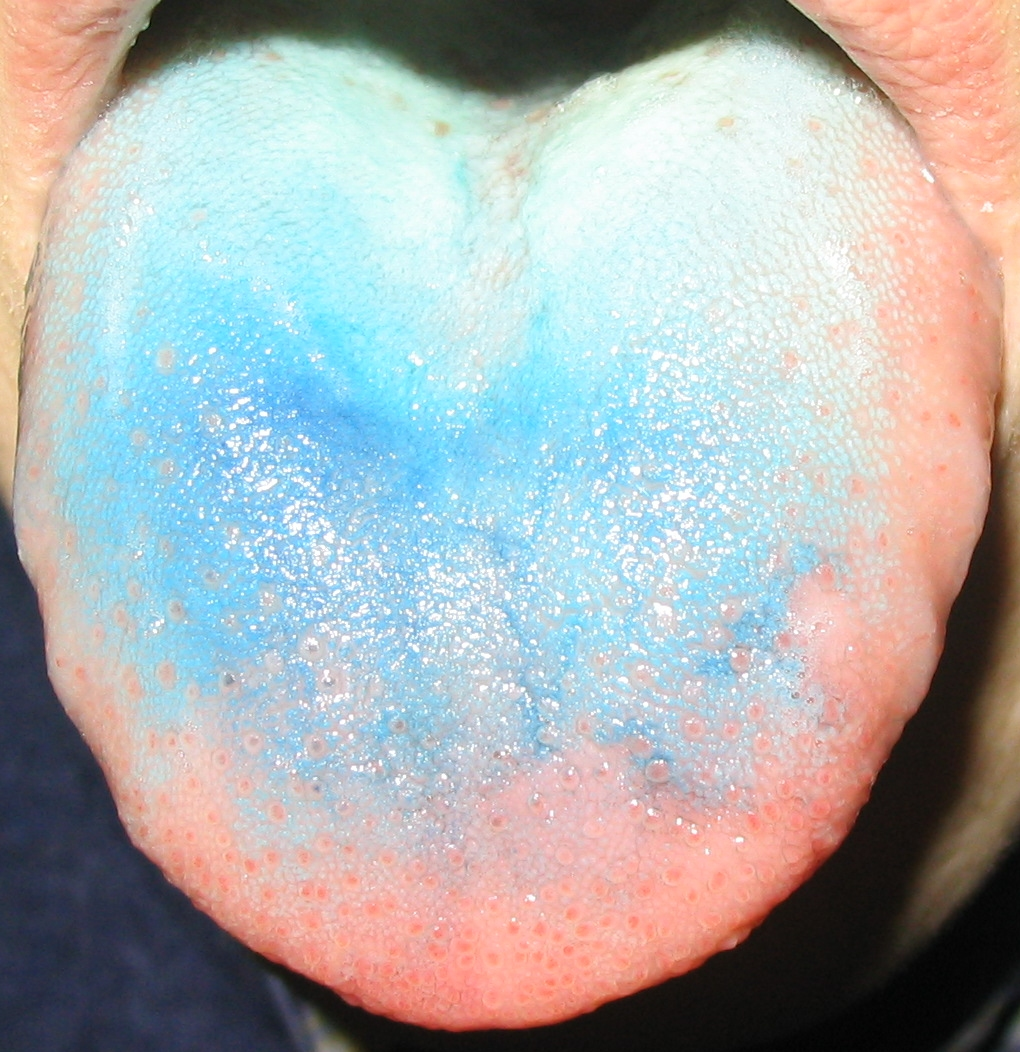
Tongue colored with blue food dye revealing the fungiform papillae.

The tongue's fungiform papillae can be revealed with blue food dye.

Supertasters were initially identified based on the perceived intensity of propylthiouracil (PROP) compared to a reference salt solution. Supertasters consume more salt in comparison to those with average taste. Subsequently, salt has been replaced with a non-oral gustatory standard. Therefore, if two individuals rate the same gustatory stimulus at a comparable perceptual intensity, but one gives a rating twice as large for the bitterness of a PROP solution, the experimenter can be confident the difference is real and not merely the result of how the person is using the scale. Today, a phenylthiocarbamide (PTC) test strip is used to help determine if someone is a low taster. The general population tastes this as bitter about 75% of the time.

Many studies do not include a cross-modal reference and categorize individuals based on the bitterness of a concentrated PROP solution or PROP-impregnated paper. Supertasters tend to have more fungiform papillae and pain receptors than tasters and non-tasters. It is also possible to make a reasonably accurate self-diagnosis at home by carefully examining the tongue and looking for the number of fungiform papillae.

== Specific food sensitivities ==
Although individual food preferences for supertasters cannot be typified, documented examples for either lessened preference or consumption include:

- Certain alcoholic beverages
- Brassica oleracea cultivars
  - Brussels sprouts
  - Cabbage
  - Kale
- Coffee
- Chocolate
- Grapefruit juice
- Green tea
- Watercress, mustard greens, horseradish, dandelion greens, rutabaga (swede), and turnip
- Soy products
- Carbonated water
- Mushrooms
- Anise and licorice
- Lower-sodium foods
- Spicy foods

== See also ==
- Sensory processing sensitivity
- Tetrachromacy
- Hypergeusia
