= Hypergeusia =

Taste disorder

Hypergeusia is a taste disorder where the sense is abnormally heightened. It can be associated with a lesion of the posterior fossa and Addison's disease; where a patient will crave for salty and sour taste due to the abnormal loss of ions with urine.

Hypergeusia is the proposed term for Supertaster in scholarly literature.
