= Benzylthiouracil =

Chemical compound

Clinical data
- AHFS/Drugs.com: International Drug Names
- Routes of administration: Oral
- ATC code: H03BA03 (WHO)

Pharmacokinetic data
- Excretion: Renal

Identifiers
- IUPAC name: 1-(1-cyclohexa-2,4-dienylmethyl)-7-thia- 3,5-diazabicyclo[4.1.0]hepta-3,5-dien-2-one
- CAS Number: 6336-50-1
- PubChem CID: 685814
- ChemSpider: 597542
- UNII: PZ35LUM333
- ChEMBL: ChEMBL1491306
- CompTox Dashboard (EPA): DTXSID30873587
- ECHA InfoCard: 100.026.106

Chemical and physical data
- Formula: C_{11}H_{10}N_{2}OS
- Molar mass: 218.27 g·mol^{−1}
- 3D model (JSmol): Interactive image
- SMILES: S=C1N/C(=C\C(=O)N1)Cc2ccccc2
- InChI: InChI=1S/C11H10N2OS/c14-10-7-9(12-11(15)13-10)6-8-4-2-1-3-5-8/h1-5,7H,6H2,(H2,12,13,14,15); Key:PNXBXCRWXNESOV-UHFFFAOYSA-N

Benzylthiouracil (BTU) is an antithyroid preparation. It is a thioamide, closely related to propylthiouracil.

== Adverse effects ==
Benzylthiouracil has been associated with severe adverse effects, notably vasculitis and subsequent ANCA-positive glomerulonephritis, as well as isolated reports of lung damage.
