= Phenylthiocarbamide =

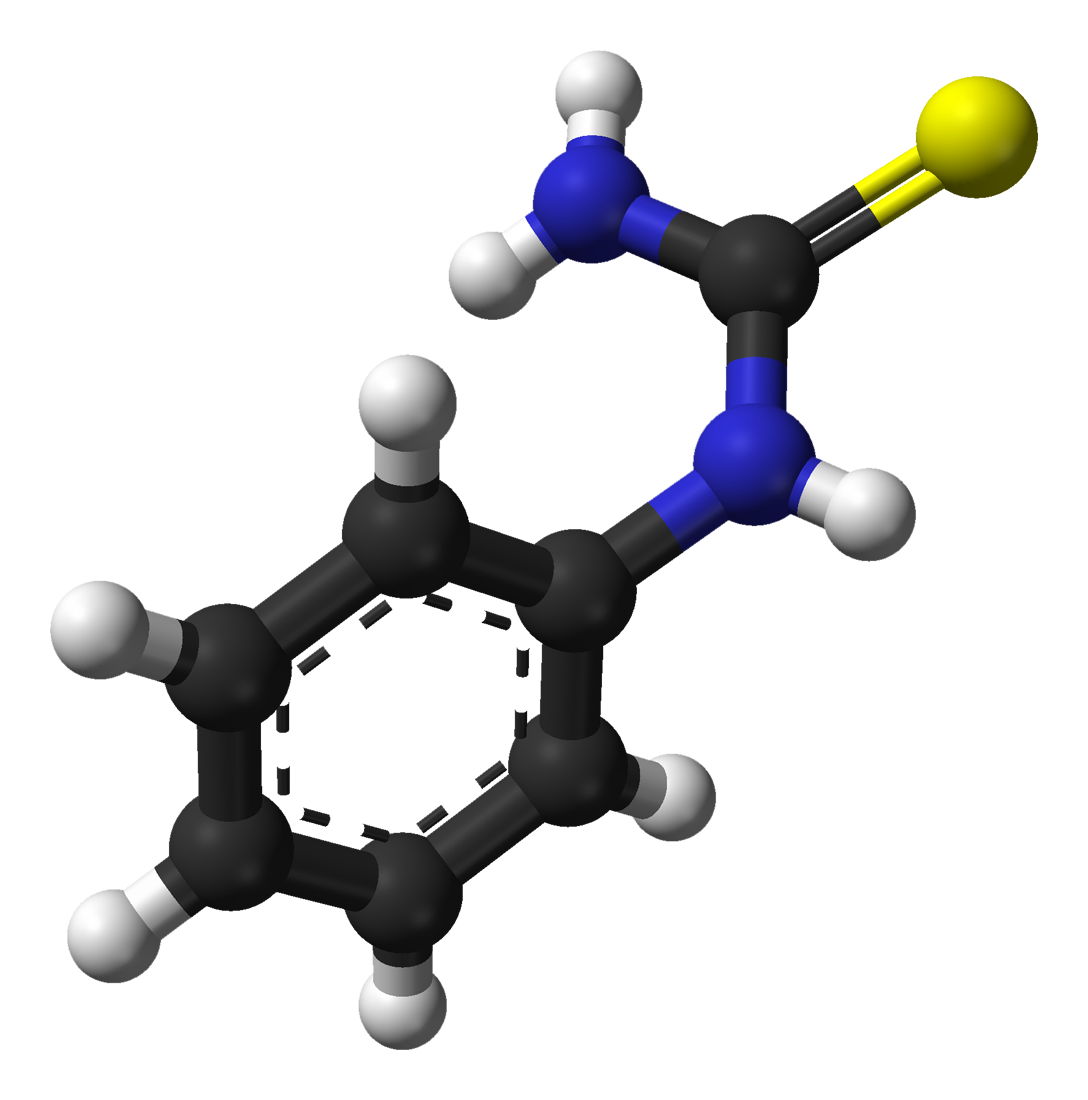

Names
- Preferred IUPAC name Phenylthiourea
- Other names N-Phenylthiourea; 1-Phenylthiourea

Identifiers
CAS Number	103-85-5
3D model (JSmol)	Interactive image
ChEBI	CHEBI:46261
ChemSpider	589165
ECHA InfoCard	100.002.865
MeSH	Phenylthiourea
PubChem CID	676454
UNII	6F82C6Q54C
CompTox Dashboard (EPA)	DTXSID9021134
- InChI: InChI=1S/C7H8N2S/c8-7(10)9-6-4-2-1-3-5-6/h1-5H,(H3,8,9,10) Key: FULZLIGZKMKICU-UHFFFAOYSA-N; InChI=1/C7H8N2S/c8-7(10)9-6-4-2-1-3-5-6/h1-5H,(H3,8,9,10) Key: FULZLIGZKMKICU-UHFFFAOYAW
- SMILES: C1=CC=C(C=C1)NC(=S)N

Properties
Chemical formula	C_{7}H_{8}N_{2}S
Molar mass	152.22 g·mol^{−1}
Appearance	White to slightly yellow powder
Density	1.294 g/cm^{3}
Melting point	145 to 150 °C (293 to 302 °F; 418 to 423 K)
Solubility in water	Soluble in boiling water

Hazards
- GHS labelling
Pictograms	(GHS06: Toxic)
Signal word	Danger
Hazard statements	H300, H317
Precautionary statements	P280, P301+P310+P330, P302+P352
NFPA 704 (fire diamond)	4 1 0
- Lethal dose or concentration (LD, LC)
LD_{50} (median dose)	3 mg/kg (oral, rat)
- Except where otherwise noted, data are given for materials in their standard state (at 25 °C [77 °F], 100 kPa). verify (what is ?) Infobox references

Phenylthiocarbamide (PTC), also known as phenylthiourea (PTU), is an organosulfur thiourea containing a phenyl ring.

It has the unusual property that it either tastes very bitter or is virtually tasteless, depending on the genetic makeup of the taster. The ability to taste PTC is often treated as a dominant genetic trait, although inheritance and expression of this trait are somewhat more complex.

PTC also inhibits melanogenesis and is used to grow transparent fish.

About 70% of people can taste PTC, varying from a low of 58% for Indigenous Australians and indigenous peoples of New Guinea to 98% for indigenous peoples of the Americas. One study has found that non-smokers and those not habituated to coffee or tea have a statistically higher percentage of tasting PTC than the general population. PTC does not occur in food, but related chemicals do, and food choice can be related to a person's ability to taste PTC.

== History ==
The tested genetic taste phenomenon of PTC was discovered in 1931 when DuPont chemist Arthur Fox (Note: Arthur L. Fox commented in his 1932 paper: "Some time ago the author had occasion to prepare a quantity of phenyl thio carbamide, and while placing it in a bottle the dust flew around in the air. Another occupant of the laboratory, Dr. C. R. Noller, complained of the bitter taste of the dust, but the author, who was much closer, observed no taste and so stated. He even tasted some of the crystals and assured Dr. Noller they were tasteless but Dr. Noller was equally certain it was the dust he tasted. He tried some of the crystals and found them extremely bitter. With these two diverse observations as a starting point, a large number of people were investigated and it was established that this peculiarity was not connected with age, race or sex. Men, women, elderly persons, children, negroes, Chinese, Germans and Italians were all shown to have in their ranks both tasters and non-tasters." Fox's finding received immediate attention, appearing in brief news stories in both Science and The Scientific News Letter. These stories focused on the curiosity of the finding, but they also caught the attention of geneticists, who were beginning to explore the organization of the human genome. Botanist Albert Francis Blakeslee replicated Fox's basic results and reported that PTC taste-blindness appears to be a recessive gene.) accidentally released a cloud of fine crystalline PTC. A nearby colleague complained about the bitter taste, while Fox, who was closer and should have received a strong dose, tasted nothing. Fox then continued to test the taste buds of assorted family and friends, setting the groundwork for future genetic studies. The genetic penetrance was so strong that it was used in paternity tests before the advent of DNA matching.

The PTC taste test has been widely used in school and college practical teaching as an example of Mendelian polymorphism in human populations. Based on a taste test, usually of a piece of paper soaked in PTC (or the less toxic propylthiouracil (PROP)), students are divided into taster and non-taster groups. By assuming that PTC tasting is determined by a dominant allele at a single autosomal gene, and that the class is an unbiased sample from a population in Hardy–Weinberg equilibrium, students then estimate allele and genotype frequencies within the larger population. While this interpretation is broadly consistent with numerous studies of this trait, it is worth noting that other genes, sex, age and environmental factors influence sensitivity to PTC. Also, there are several alleles segregating at the major gene determining the taste of PTC, particularly in African populations, and the common "taster" allele is incompletely dominant (homozygotes for this allele are more sensitive to PTC than are heterozygotes). Additionally, PTC is toxic and sensitivity to the substitute, PROP, does not show a strong association with the gene controlling ability to taste PTC.

== Role in taste ==
There is a large body of evidence linking the ability to taste thiourea compounds and dietary habits. Much of this work has focused on 6-propyl-2-thiouracil (PROP), a compound related to PTC that has lower toxicity. A supertaster has more of an ability to taste PTC. On the other hand, heavy cigarette smokers are more likely to have high PTC and PROP thresholds (i.e. are relatively insensitive).

In 1976, an inverse relationship between taster status for PTC and for a bitter component of the fruit of the tree Antidesma bunius was discovered. Research on the implications still continues.

Ability to taste PTC may be correlated with a dislike of plants in the genus Brassica, presumably due to chemical similarities. However, studies in Africa show a poor correlation between PTC tasting and dietary differences.

== Genetics ==
Much of the variation in tasting of PTC is associated with polymorphism at the TAS2R38 taste receptor gene. In humans, there are three SNPs (single nucleotide polymorphisms) along the gene that may render its proteins unresponsive. There is conflicting evidence as to whether the inheritance of this trait is dominant or incompletely dominant. Any person with a single functional copy of this gene can make the protein and is sensitive to PTC. Some studies have shown that homozygous tasters experience a more intense bitterness than people that are heterozygous; other studies have indicated that another gene may determine taste sensitivity.

The frequency of PTC taster and non-taster alleles vary in different human populations. The widespread occurrence of non-taster alleles at intermediate frequencies, much more common than recessive alleles conferring genetic disease, across many isolated populations, suggests that this polymorphism may have been maintained through balancing selection.

Chimpanzees and orangutans also vary in their ability to taste PTC, with the proportions of tasters and non-tasters similar to that in humans. The ability to taste PTC is an ancestral trait of hominids that has been independently lost in humans and chimpanzees, through distinct mutations at TAS2R38.

=== Non-taster phenotype distribution in selected populations ===
Results of multiple PTC taste tests in different regions done with the discrimination method developed by Harris and Kalmus in 1949, published in Annals of Eugenics.
Location	# of Participants	Non-taster %	References
Bosnia and Herzegovina	7,362	32.02	Hadžiselimović et al. (1982)
Croatia	200	27.5	Grünwald, Pfeifer (1962)
Czech Republic	785	32.7	Kubičkova, Dvořaková (1968)
Denmark	251	32.7	Harrison et al. (1977)
England	441	31.5	Harrison et al. (1977)
Hungary	436	32.2	Forai, Bankovi (1967)
Italy	1,031	29.19	Floris et al. (1976)
Montenegro	256	28.20	Hadžiselimović et al. (1982)
Užice, Serbia	1,129	16.65	Hadžiselimović et al. (1982)
Voivodina, Serbia	600	26.3	Božić, Gavrilović (1973)
Russia	486	36.6	Boyd (1950)
Slovenia	126	37.3	Brodar (1970)
Spain	204	25.6	Harrison et al. (1977)

== See also ==
- TAS2R38
- PTC tasting
- List of Mendelian traits in humans
- Antidesma bunius
- Propylthiouracil
- Cilantro
