= TAS2R38 =

Protein-coding gene in the species Homo sapiens

Identifiers
- Aliases: TAS2R38, PTC, T2R38, T2R61, taste 2 receptor member 38, THIOT
- External IDs: OMIM: 607751; MGI: 2681306; GeneCards: TAS2R38

Gene location (Human)
Chr.	Chromosome 7 (human)
Band	7q34	Start	141,972,631 bp
Band	7q34	End	141,973,773 bp

Gene location (Mouse)
Chr.	Chromosome 6 (mouse)
Band	6|6 B1	Start	40,589,249 bp
Band	6|6 B1	End	40,590,244 bp
RNA expression pattern
Bgee	Human / Mouse (ortholog); Top expressed in: rectum; mucosa of transverse colon; sural nerve; duodenum; placenta; mucosa of small intestine; smooth muscle tissue; male reproductive gland; prostate / Top expressed in: proximal tubule; More reference expression data
BioGPS	n/a
Gene ontology
Molecular function	G protein-coupled receptor activity; signal transducer activity; bitter taste receptor activity
Cellular component	membrane; plasma membrane; integral component of membrane
Biological process	detection of chemical stimulus involved in sensory perception of bitter taste; signal transduction; response to stimulus; sensory perception of taste; G protein-coupled receptor signaling pathway
Sources:Amigo / QuickGO
Orthologs
Databases	NCBI: entry; OMA: entry
Species	Human	Mouse
Entrez	5726	387513
Ensembl	ENSG00000257138	ENSMUSG00000058250
UniProt	P59533	Q7TQA6
RefSeq (mRNA)	NM_176817	NM_001001451
RefSeq (protein)	NP_789787	NP_001001451
Location (UCSC)	Chr 7: 141.97 – 141.97 Mb	Chr 6: 40.59 – 40.59 Mb
PubMed search
- Wikidata
View/Edit Human	View/Edit Mouse

Taste receptor 2 member 38 is a protein that in humans is encoded by the TAS2R38 gene. TAS2R38 is a bitter taste receptor; varying genotypes of TAS2R38 influence the ability to taste both 6-n-propylthiouracil (PROP) and phenylthiocarbamide (PTC). Though it has often been proposed that varying taste receptor genotypes could influence tasting ability, TAS2R38 is one of the few taste receptors shown to have this function.

== Signal transduction ==
As with all TAS2R proteins, TAS2R38 utilizes the G-protein gustducin as its primary method of signal transduction. Both the α- and βγ-subunits are crucial to the transmission of the taste signal. See: taste receptor.

== Ligands ==
To date, a total of 37 distinct ligands have been identified for the T2R38 bitter taste receptor. These ligands have been extensively cataloged and documented in the comprehensive database known as BitterDB. Within this repository of bitter taste information, notable ligands such as PTC (phenylthiocarbamide) and PROP ( 6-n-propylthiouracil) have been extensively studied and are widely recognized. Additionally, T2R38 has been found to interact with other intriguing ligands, including limonin, a compound commonly found in citrus fruits, cyclamate, an artificial sweetener, and chlorpheniramine, an antihistamine employed for the management of allergic conditions. The range of ligands recognized by the T2R38 receptor adds to our understanding of the complex molecular interactions involved in the perception of bitter taste.

== Tissue distribution ==
Taste GPCRs are expressed not only in the oral cavity but also in extra-oral tissues. Bitter taste receptors that are expressed in extra-oral tissues fill a variety of functional physiological roles. TAS2R38 is expressed in many tissues, such as human sinonasal epithelial cells, airway smooth muscle, monocytes, macrophages, heart, arteries, thyroid, skin, etc.

== Clinical significance ==
=== PTC sensitivity ===
Differential ability to taste the bitter compound phenylthiocarbamide (PTC) was discovered more than 80 years ago. Since then, PTC tasting ability has been mapped to chromosome 7q and, several years later, was shown to be directly related to TAS2R38 genotype. There are three common polymorphisms in the TAS2R38 gene—A49P, V262A, and I296V — which combine to form two common haplotypes and several other very rare haplotypes. The two common haplotypes are AVI (often called "nontaster") and PAV (often called "taster"). Varying combinations of these haplotypes will yield homozygotes—PAV/PAV and AVI/AVI—and heterozygotes—PAV/AVI. These genotypes can account for up to 85% of the variation in PTC tasting ability: people possessing two copies of the PAV polymorphism report PTC to be more bitter than TAS2R38 heterozygotes, and people possessing two copies of the AVI/AVI polymorphism often report PTC as being essentially tasteless. These polymorphisms are hypothesized to affect taste by altering G-protein-binding domains.

Because bitter substances are usually toxic, the presence of a "nontaster" geno- and phenotype seems evolutionarily undesirable. Several studies have suggested, however, that the AVI polymorphism may code for an entirely new receptor which processes a different and as-yet undiscovered bitter compound. Furthermore, the presence of the nontaster allele may reflect the desirability of maintaining a mostly heterozygous population; this group of people may possess flexibility in their bitter taste perception, enabling them to avoid a greater number of toxins than either homozygotic group. Other studies, however, suggest that the AVI nontaster genotype has no functional ligand. For an evolutionary perspective, the reference sequences for gorillas and chimps have the PAV haplotype, while mouse and rat have PAI.

This genotypical alteration of taste phenotype is currently unique to TAS2R38. Though genotype has been proposed as a mechanism for determining individual taste preferences, TAS2R38 is so far the first and only taste receptor to display this property.

=== PROP sensitivity ===
The TAS2R38 protein also confers sensitivity to the bitter compound 6-n-propylthiouracil (PROP). Because perception of PROP bitterness has been associated with supertasting, and because TAS2R38 genotypes associate with PROP-tasting phenotypes, it has been proposed that TAS2R38 genotypes may have a role in supertasting capabilities. It appears that while TAS2R38 genotypes determine a threshold of PROP tasting abilities, the genotypes cannot account for the differences in tasting amongst each threshold group. For example, some PAV/PAV homozygotes perceive PROP to be more bitter than others, and TAS2R38 genotype cannot account for these differences. Furthermore, some heterozygotes may become PROP supertasters (despite a lack of two PAV alleles), indicating overlap between PROP bitterness levels and varying TAS2R38 genotypes. These results illustrate that a mechanism beyond TAS2R38 genotype contributes to supertasting capabilities.

Because fungiform papillae (FP) number varies with PROP bitterness, TAS2R38 genotype was also suspected to alter FP number. Again, however, TAS2R38 genotype could not explain FP alterations. Additionally, FP number was not a strong predictor of PROP bitterness amongst TAS2R38 heterozygotes, indicating, again, a lack of knowledge about the relationship between PROP bitterness, TAS2R38, and supertasting. Research is leaning toward a second receptor with PROP sensitivity that confers supertasting abilities.

The perceived bitterness of cruciferous vegetables, such as broccoli, results from glucosinolates and their hydrolysis products, particularly isothiocyanates and other sulfur-containing compounds. Preliminary research indicates that genetic inheritance through the gene TAS2R38 may be responsible in part for bitter taste perception in broccoli.

As with watercress, mustard greens, turnip, broccoli and horseradish, human perception of bitterness in rutabaga is governed by a gene affecting the TAS2R bitter receptor, which detects the glucosinolates in rutabaga. Sensitive individuals with the genotype PAV/PAV (supertasters) find rutabaga twice as bitter as insensitive subjects (AVI/AVI). The difference for the mixed type (PAV/AVI) is insignificant for rutabaga. As a result, sensitive individuals may find some rutabagas too bitter to eat.

=== Drug consumption ===
PROP bitterness and TAS2R38 genotype have been further examined in relation to alcohol intake. Research has suggested that the level of alcohol consumption may correlate with the level of perceived bitterness of ethanol; those people who find PROP to be more bitter also find the taste of ethanol to be less pleasant. However, correlates between the TAS2R38 genotype and the taste of alcohol were not significant: the TAS2R38 genotype could not predict the intensity of alcohol bitterness (though PROP bitterness did correlate with alcohol bitterness). Genotype could predict alcohol intake; those with nontaster alleles were more likely to consume more alcohol over the course of the year. Again, a second genetic factor seems to contribute to these phenomena. A gene altering the density of fungiform papillae may provide this second factor.

PTC sensitivity and TAS2R38 genotype have been researched in relation to smoking behavior. It was suggested in a research that non-tasters may be likely to smoke cigarettes more, compared to PTC tasters, that is due to the fact that tobacco smoke contains chemical substances that activate TAS2R38.

Gene variation in TAS2R38 was associated with food intake and preference, and obesity risk. The genetic variation is involved with consumption of fruits, sweets and fat, it was shown in a research that non-tasters had higher intake of these food products that might lead to obesity.

=== Pathogen resistance ===
Bitter taste receptors exhibit expression in various cell types within the sinonasal and airway regions. Other ligands that activate T2R38 are N-Acyl homoserine lactones (AHLs) are a class of signaling molecules involved in bacterial quorum sensing. Upon encountering these agonists, the receptors initiate a signaling cascade that relies on T2R activation. Consequently, this cascade triggers the release of nitric oxide (NO), a potent bactericidal agent, thereby promoting both bactericidal activity and an enhancement in mucociliary clearance (MCC).

Notably, a correlation has been observed between medically refractory chronic rhinosinusitis (CRS) and nonprotective genetic variants of the TAS2R38 gene. Certain polymorphisms associated with TAS2R38 have been linked to decreased incidence of allergies, asthma, nasal polyposis, aspirin sensitivity, and diabetes among CRS patients, although statistical significance has not yet been established.

== See also ==
- Supertaster
- Taste receptor
- PTC tasting
