= PTC tasting =

Genetic marker commonly used in human genetics investigations

Testing substance (PTC) structure: Phenylthiocarbamide/ Phenyl-thio-carbamide/ Phenylthiourea

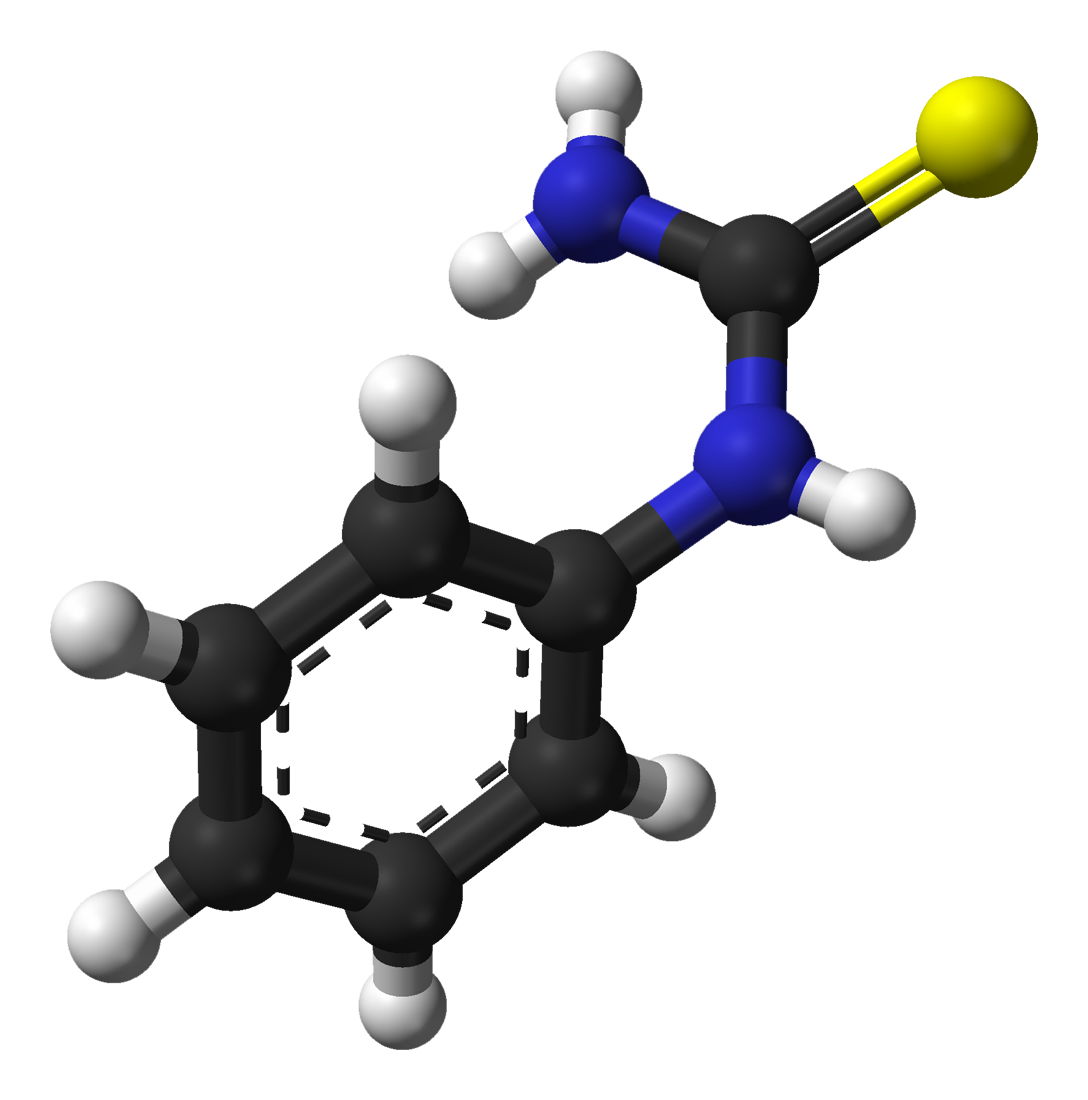
PTC molecule

PTC tasting is a classic genetic marker in human population genetics investigations.

== History ==
In 1931 Arthur Fox, a chemist at DuPont, in Wilmington, Delaware, synthesized phenylthiocarbamide (PTC). Some researchers reported a bitter taste when entering his laboratory, while others, including Fox himself, experienced no such sensation. Further study of this phenomenon by L.H. Snyder in 1931 led to the conclusion that the inability to taste PTC was a recessive trait. However, in 1932, Albert Blakeslee conducted a large-scale study involving the inheritance of PTC tasting within families that concluded that PTC tasting sensitivity is very likely a complex Mendelian trait whose variance is overwhelmingly dependent on a single gene locus; further, it is likely that a few other genes have a smaller effect as well.

In 1939, Fisher et al. found that the genetic frequency of PTC tasting was the same in both chimps and humans. This suggests that the gene controller for PTC tasting provides a selective advantage in order to have either evolved and been maintained for millions of years since before humans and chimps diverged into separate species, or to have evolved in two separate events after species divergence. Since finding out that PTC tasting had an apparent naturally selective advantage, scientists began to hypothesize that this advantage was that the ability to taste natural chemicals similar to PTC helped human ancestors stay away from some toxic plants. Substances that resemble PTC today are in some vegetables from the cabbage family (Brassicaceae), such as broccoli and Brussels sprouts.

In 1950, William Boyd found evidence that the same gene that controls for PTC tasting also controls for the "tasting" of a different compound that acts as an antithyroid drug similar to that found in cabbage plants. Despite all of this compelling evidence for PTC "tasters" to have a selective advantage over "non-tasters," there was no explanation for the consistent proportions of "non-taster" in human and chimp populations until scientists discovered that subjects with a "PTC non-taster" phenotype were able to taste a different bitter compound that "PTC tasters" could not. This compound was juice from an antidesma plant and notably, this study found a perfectly inverse relationship between PTC and antidesma tasting. These results were replicated in 2005 by another team of researchers who found the same inverse relationship between PTC and antidesma tasting However, in 2018, Davide Risso and colleagues expanded upon this relationship when they discovered a notable difference from previous studies. What they found was that there appeared to be a small population of people who could taste both "PTC" and antidesma as bitter. This finding could suggest a possible advantage for heterozygotes given their ability to taste both bitter compounds.

== Genetics ==
In 1999, Mark Hoon and a team of researchers discovered a gene family that codes for taste receptors, specifically for the "bitter" flavor which they called the TAS2R gene family. The locus of the gene (or genes) that control for PTC tasting is hypothesized to be a part of this TAS2R gene family. In 2003, Dennis Drayna and his colleagues at the National Institutes of Health (NIH), as well as a team of researchers led by Un-kyung Kim, discovered that a variation at the TAS2R38 gene locus is responsible for an overwhelming majority of the variance in PTC tasting sensitivity (50–80%).

It has been suggested that taste and smell receptors are controlled by TAS2R38, with a small intron gene of about 1000 nucleotides. It is a member of the family of G protein-coupled or 7 trans membrane cross receptors. The binding of a ligand to the extracellular region of the receptor sets an action potential that sends an impulse to the sensory cortex of the brain, where it is interpreted as a bitter taste.

This allows an experimental test for SNP at position 145 that has the highest correlation to the sample 3 polymorphisms. The test isolates DNA from cheek cells by a simple salt mouthwash and amplification of a region of the gene TAS2R38. The amplified fragment (amplicon) is incubated with the restriction enzyme HaeIII, comprising the SNP in their recognition sequence GGCC. HaeIII cuts the taster allele (having the sequence GGCC); this generates a length polymorphism, and the 2 alleles can be easily separated in an agarose gel.

Virtually all non-tasters (dd) cannot taste PTC, while homozygous tasters (TT) occasionally report an inability or weak ability to taste the chemical. The heterozygous genotype (Tt) has the "leakiest" phenotype as reduced or absent tasting ability is relatively common. This is formally called a heterozygous effect.

=== Harris – Kalmus' threshold solutions and differentiation ===
In 1949, Harris and Kalmus developed a method for differentiation of bimodal threshold stimuli for tasting PTC. They proposed a series of 13 solutions of these substances with serial water by halves from the initial concentration of 0.13%, so that the solution in the final test contained only a few molecules of this substance. Pure water was used as the fourteenth test liquid to provide a control. Differentiation between the two phenotypes of "tasters" and "non-tasters" occurred with the fifth solution. Then assuming that the conditional dimorphism controlled by two allele of the corresponding gene locus, the allele which controls the absence of sensitivity to taste PTC is recessive homozygote.

- Testing solutions scale after Harris and Kalmus

Solution	PTC (%)
1	0.13
2	0.065
3	0.0325
4	0.01625
5	0.008125
6	0.0040625
7	0.00203125
8	0.001015625
9	0.0005078125
10	0.00025390625
11	0.000126953125
12	0.0000634765625
13	0.00003173828125
14	Boiled tap water was used both for making up the solutions and for controls.

Although the view of the genetics of individual sensitivity to taste PTC changed, practically all the current data on the PTC taste (in)ability established certain of these substances originate from research by Harris and Kalmus, and such investigations are still taken. This is probably because it is not suggested a better method for mass population genetics projects.

=== Non-taster phenotype distribution in selected populations ===
Results of multiple PTC taste tests in different regions done with the discrimination method developed by Harris and Kalmus in 1949, published in Annals of Eugenics.
Location	# of Participants	Non-taster %	References
Bosnia and Herzegovina	7,362	32.02	Hadžiselimović et al. (1982)
Croatia	200	27.5	Grünwald, Pfeifer (1962)
Czech Republic	785	32.7	Kubičkova, Dvořaková (1968)
Denmark	251	32.7	Harrison et al. (1977)
England	441	31.5	Harrison et al. (1977)
Hungary	436	32.2	Forai, Bankovi (1967)
Italy	1,031	29.19	Floris et al. (1976)
Montenegro	256	28.20	Hadžiselimović et al. (1982)
Užice, Serbia	1,129	16.65	Hadžiselimović et al. (1982)
Voivodina, Serbia	600	26.3	Božić, Gavrilović (1973)
Russia	486	36.6	Boyd (1950)
Slovenia	126	37.2	Brodar (1970)
Spain	203	25.5	Harrison et al. (1977)
