= Beefy meaty peptide =

Names
- IUPAC name Lysylglycyl-α-aspartyl-α-glutamyl-α-glutamylserylleucylalanine
- Systematic IUPAC name (2S,5S,8S,11S,14S,17S)-11,14-Bis(2-carboxyethyl)-17-{2-[(2S)-2,6-diaminohexanamido]acetamido}-8-(hydroxymethyl)-2-methyl-5-(2-methylpropyl)-4,7,10,13,16-pentaoxo-3,6,9,12,15-pentaazanonadecanedioic acid
- Other names Delicious peptide; BMP; BMP (peptide); L-Lysylglycyl-L-α-aspartyl-L-α-glutamyl-L-α-glutamyl-L-seryl-L-leucyl-L-alanine; KGDEESLA

Identifiers
CAS Number	73984-05-1
3D model (JSmol)	Interactive image
ChemSpider	9269228
PubChem CID	11094085
UNII	HE0DS1PZ2R
CompTox Dashboard (EPA)	DTXSID601027510
- InChI: InChI=1S/C34H57N9O16/c1-16(2)12-21(31(55)38-17(3)34(58)59)42-33(57)23(15-44)43-30(54)20(8-10-26(48)49)40-29(53)19(7-9-25(46)47)41-32(56)22(13-27(50)51)39-24(45)14-37-28(52)18(36)6-4-5-11-35/h16-23,44H,4-15,35-36H2,1-3H3,(H,37,52)(H,38,55)(H,39,45)(H,40,53)(H,41,56)(H,42,57)(H,43,54)(H,46,47)(H,48,49)(H,50,51)(H,58,59)/t17-,18-,19-,20-,21-,22-,23-/m0/s1 Key: JYGRAOYMDDFOSM-FQJIPJFPSA-N; InChI=1/C34H57N9O16/c1-16(2)12-21(31(55)38-17(3)34(58)59)42-33(57)23(15-44)43-30(54)20(8-10-26(48)49)40-29(53)19(7-9-25(46)47)41-32(56)22(13-27(50)51)39-24(45)14-37-28(52)18(36)6-4-5-11-35/h16-23,44H,4-15,35-36H2,1-3H3,(H,37,52)(H,38,55)(H,39,45)(H,40,53)(H,41,56)(H,42,57)(H,43,54)(H,46,47)(H,48,49)(H,50,51)(H,58,59)/t17-,18-,19-,20-,21-,22-,23-/m0/s1 Key: JYGRAOYMDDFOSM-FQJIPJFPBN
- SMILES: CC(C)CC(C(=O)NC(C)C(=O)O)NC(=O)C(CO)NC(=O)C(CCC(=O)O)NC(=O)C(CCC(=O)O)NC(=O)C(CC(=O)O)NC(=O)CNC(=O)C(CCCCN)N

Properties
Chemical formula	C_{34}H_{57}N_{9}O_{16}
Molar mass	847.877 g·mol^{−1}
- Except where otherwise noted, data are given for materials in their standard state (at 25 °C [77 °F], 100 kPa). verify (what is ?) Infobox references

Beefy meaty peptide, also known as delicious peptide and abbreviated as BMP, is an 8-amino acid long peptide that has been identified as giving a beefy flavour to foods in which it is present. It was isolated from beef soup by Yamasaki and Maekawa in 1978. Ongoing research since its discovery by Yamasaki and Maekawa has provided general support for the presence of its flavor-imparting properties. However, due to its high production cost, the peptide's potential for widespread application in the food industry has yet to be realized, prompting current research efforts to focus on finding a method of mass-production for the peptide.

== Sequencing ==
The primary sequence

- Lys-Gly-Asp-Glu-Glu-Ser-Leu-Ala

was first determined by Yamasaki and Maekawa, who carried out the experiment using the Edman degradation method for N-terminus sequencing and carboxypeptidase A (Cpase A) and triazination methods for C-terminus sequencing. At the time of the experiment (1978), both methods were used in order to determine the amino acid composition and order of the sequence, including the discovery of a Glu-Glu linkage and the detection of alanine at the C-terminus. However, nowadays, either technique is sufficient to sequence the entire peptide.

== Umami taste ==
On a molecular level, the umami taste is registered when molecules such as glutamate and aspartate bind to the ligand-binding domains of specialized taste receptors. Once activated, these receptors send electrical pulses that travel to the brain via sensory neurons. In 1989, Tamura et al. found that, by themselves, basic residues such as Lys-Gly and Lys-Lys produced sour and salty tastes in their dihydrochloride forms while acidic residues such as Asp-Glu-Glu and Lys-Gly produced sour and sweet tastes. However, the umami taste is produced by combinations of acidic and basic amino acid residues, such as Lys-Gly-Asp. More specifically, the umami taste found in BMP is generated by the combination of lysine at the N-terminus and the acidic amino acids (Asp-Glu-Glu) in the midsection of the peptide, which suggests that cations and anions play a role in the stimulation of taste receptors to produce the umami taste.

However, other factors beyond the presence of certain amino acids can affect the taste response of the peptide. The intensity of the umami taste increases when the acidic peptide interacts with cations to form a salt. At a threshold value of 1.25 millimolar (mM), the Asp-Glu dipeptide generates the strongest umami taste when exposed to NaOH and subjected to a pH increase. Position of the amino acids also play a role in taste intensity, as a Glu-Asp dipeptide registers at a threshold value of 3.14 mM, meaning it would need a higher amount of the compound in order for a person to register the umami taste. Additionally, while a Lys-Gly-HCl analog would register a salty, umami taste at 1.22 mM, a Gly-Lys-HCl analog registers a sour and sweet taste at 5.48 mM. Thus, the research findings indicated that flavor can be modified in taste and strength through modification of acidic residues in peptides, opening up possibilities for the production of BMP-like peptides with greater taste intensity. Although its taste intensity does not change according to pH, BMP has been described to produce different tastes according to pH changes. Notably, it is reported to be sour at a pH of 3.5, umami at a pH of 6.5, and sweet, sour, and umami at a pH of 9.5.

== Applications ==
BMP has been shown to remain stable, without breaking down, in high-heat pasteurization and sterilization conditions, making it possible for potential use for culinary purposes. Those advocating for the presence of BMP's flavor-enhancing umami taste report that its taste is similar to that of monosodium glutamate. Consequently, BMP possesses potential for large-scale commercialization in the food industry. However, the primary obstacle is the cost of mass production associated with the peptide. Currently, the main modes of production for specific flavor peptides such as BMP are chemical and enzymatic synthesis, both of which involve high production costs.

== See also ==
- Umami peptide
