= Thiamazole =

Chemical compound

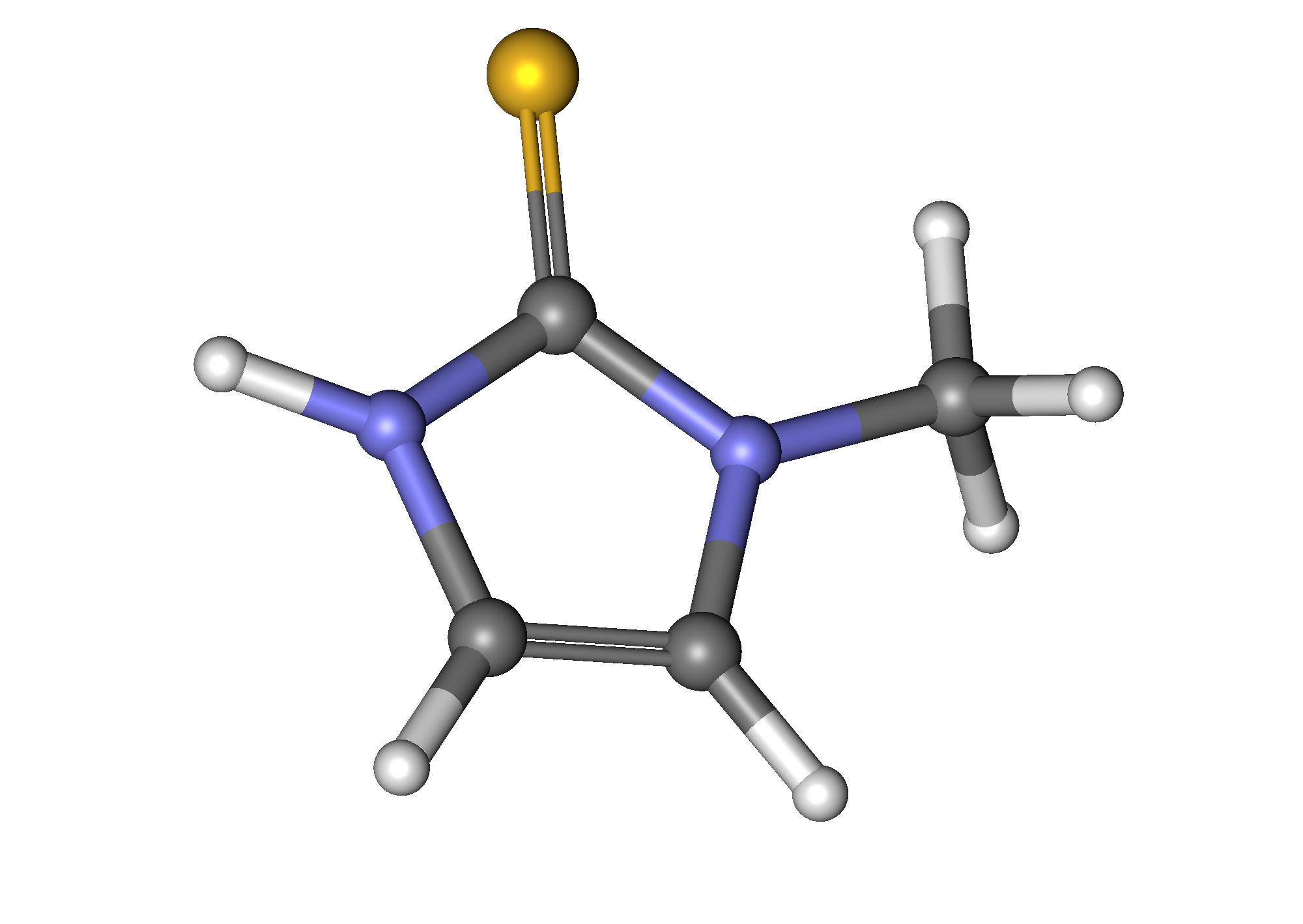

Clinical data
- Trade names: Tapazole, others
- Other names: methimazole (USAN US)
- AHFS/Drugs.com: Monograph
- MedlinePlus: a682464
- License data: US DailyMed: Thiamazole
- Routes of administration: By mouth
- ATC code: H03BB02 (WHO)

Legal status
- Legal status: AU: S4 (Prescription only); CA: ℞-only; US: ℞-only

Pharmacokinetic data
- Bioavailability: 93%
- Protein binding: None
- Metabolism: Liver
- Elimination half-life: 5–6 hours
- Excretion: Kidney

Identifiers
- IUPAC name: 1-Methyl-3H-imidazole-2-thione
- CAS Number: 60-56-0
- PubChem CID: 1349907
- IUPHAR/BPS: 6649
- DrugBank: DB00763
- ChemSpider: 1131173
- UNII: 554Z48XN5E
- KEGG: D00401
- ChEBI: CHEBI:50673
- ChEMBL: ChEMBL1515
- CompTox Dashboard (EPA): DTXSID4020820
- ECHA InfoCard: 100.000.439

Chemical and physical data
- Formula: C_{4}H_{6}N_{2}S
- Molar mass: 114.17 g·mol^{−1}
- 3D model (JSmol): Interactive image
- Melting point: 146 °C (295 °F)
- Solubility in water: 275 mg/mL (20 °C)
- SMILES: Cn1cc[nH]c1=S
- InChI: InChI=1S/C4H6N2S/c1-6-3-2-5-4(6)7/h2-3H,1H3,(H,5,7); Key:PMRYVIKBURPHAH-UHFFFAOYSA-N

Thiamazole, also known as methimazole, is a medication used to treat hyperthyroidism. This includes Graves' disease, toxic multinodular goiter, and thyrotoxic crisis. It is taken by mouth. Full effects may take a few weeks to occur.

Common side effects include itchiness, hair loss, nausea, muscle pain, swelling, and abdominal pain. Severe side effects may include low blood cell counts, liver failure, and vasculitis. Use is not recommended during the first trimester of pregnancy due to the risk of congenital anomalies, but it may be used in the second trimester or third trimester. It may be used during breastfeeding. Those who developed significant side effects may also have problems with propylthiouracil. Thiamazole is a cyclic thiourea derivative that works by decreasing the production of thyroid hormones.

Thiamazole was approved for medical use in the United States in 1950. It is on the World Health Organization's List of Essential Medicines. It is available as a generic medication. It is also available in Europe and Asia. In 2023, it was the 255th most commonly prescribed medication in the United States, with more than 1 million prescriptions.

== Medical uses ==
Thiamazole is a drug used to treat hyperthyroidism such as in Graves' disease, a condition that occurs when the thyroid gland begins to produce an excess of thyroid hormone. The drug may also be taken before thyroid surgery to lower thyroid hormone levels and minimize the effects of thyroid manipulation. Additionally, thiamazole is used in the veterinary setting to treat hyperthyroidism in cats.

== Adverse effects ==
It is important to monitor any symptoms of fever or sore throat while taking thiamazole; this could indicate the development of agranulocytosis, an uncommon but severe side effect resulting from a drop in the white blood cell count (to be specific, neutropenia, a deficiency of neutrophils). A complete blood count (CBC) with differential is performed to confirm the suspicion, in which case the drug is discontinued. Administration of recombinant human granulocyte colony-stimulating factor (rhG-CSF) may increase recovery.

=== Liver injury ===
Methimazole is commonly associated with transient, mild, asymptomatic elevations in serum aminotransferase levels, typically during the first months of treatment with a high dose. More serious liver injury can, usually with a cholestatic or mixed pattern of enzyme elevations and prolonged cholestatic hepatitis. Methimazole induced liver injury fatalities are rare and symptoms and jaundice usually clear within 2-8 weeks of stopping the drug. In most cases switching to propylthiouracil does not result in a recurrence of liver injury.

To differentiate methimazole induced liver injury from liver injury related to the underlying hyperthyroidism, it is recommended to check baseline liver enzymes prior to initiation of treatment.

Other known side effects include:

- skin rash
- itching
- abnormal hair loss
- upset stomach
- vomiting
- loss of taste
- abnormal sensations (tingling, prickling, burning, tightness, and pulling)
- swelling
- joint and muscle pain
- drowsiness
- dizziness
- decreased platelet count (thrombocytopenia)
- aplasia cutis congenita (prenatal exposure)
- thyroid gland enlargement (prenatal exposure)
- choanal atresia (prenatal exposure during the first trimester of pregnancy)
- acute pancreatitis

== Interaction ==
Adverse effects may occur for individuals who:

- Take anticoagulants ('blood thinners') such as warfarin (Coumadin), diabetes medications, digoxin (Lanoxin), theophylline (Theobid, Theo-Dur), and vitamins
- Have ever had any blood disease, such as decreased white blood cells (leukopenia), decreased platelets (thrombocytopenia) or aplastic anemia, or liver disease (hepatitis, jaundice)

== Mechanism of action ==
Thiamazole inhibits the enzyme thyroperoxidase, which normally acts in thyroid hormone synthesis by oxidizing the anion iodide (I^{−}) to iodine (I_{2}), hypoiodous acid (HOI), and enzyme linked hypoiodate (EOI), facilitating iodine's addition to tyrosine residues on the hormone precursor thyroglobulin, a necessary step in the synthesis of triiodothyronine (T_{3}) and thyroxine (T_{4}).

It does not inhibit the action of the sodium-dependent iodide transporter located on follicular cells' basolateral membranes. Inhibition of this step requires competitive inhibitors such as perchlorate and thiocyanate.

A study has shown that it modulates secretion of CXCL10.

== Chemical properties ==
The cyclic thiourea derivative thiamazole is a white to matte brown crystalline powder with a characteristic odour. The boiling point is 280 °C (decomposition). Thiamazole is soluble in water, ethanol and chloroform, but hardly soluble in ether.

Thiamazole acts as a free radical scavenger for radicals such as the hydroxyl radical (^{•}OH) radical. It is used as free radical scavenger in organic chemistry.

=== Laboratory synthesis ===
Thiamazole has been known since 1889, when it was made by a two-stage process starting from 2,2-diethoxyethaneamine, which was reacted with methyl isothiocyanate.

The product of this reaction was then cyclised in an acid-catalysed reaction to form thiamazole.

=== Manufacture ===
When the therapeutic potential of thiamazole was recognised in the late 1940s, a number of alternative routes were developed based, for example, on the use of 2-chloro-1,2-diethoxyethane as starting material, in a reaction with methylamine.

The resulting intermediate can be treated with potassium thiocyanate in the presence of acid to give thiamazole.

== History ==
Surgery was used to treat hyperthyroidism until the advent of drug therapies in the 1940s. In 1942, thiourea was used by Edwin B. Astwood to treat a patient with the condition. He later published evidence that thiouracil was more effective and began a search for analogues with higher potency and less toxicity. In 1949 he published his work on thiamazole which showed its superiority to previous therapies. The compound had been known since 1889, and was developed as a drug by Eli Lilly and Company under the trade name Tapazole.

== Veterinary uses ==
Thiamazole is commonly used in cats to treat hyperthyroidism.

Despite 20% of cats treated with thiamazole testing positive for antinuclear antibody lupus erythematosus and immune-mediated haemolytic anemia, neither condition is associated with thiamazole in cats.

Hepatic toxicity also occurs in a small but notable amount of cats treated with thiamazole.

In July 2024, the US Food and Drug Administration (FDA) approved Felanorm, the first generic methimazole oral solution for the treatment of hyperthyroidism in cats. Felanorm contains the same active ingredient (methimazole) as the approved brand name drug product, Felimazole Coated Tablets, which were first approved in May 2009. In addition, the FDA determined that Felanorm contains no inactive ingredients that may significantly affect the bioavailability of the active ingredient. Felanorm is sponsored by Norbrook Laboratories based in the United Kingdom.
