= 2-Thiouracil =

Names
- Preferred IUPAC name 2-Sulfanylidene-2,3-dihydropyrimidin-4(1H)-one

Identifiers
CAS Number	141-90-2
3D model (JSmol)	Interactive image
ChEBI	CHEBI:348530
ChEMBL	ChEMBL345768
ChemSpider	1066108
ECHA InfoCard	100.005.008
KEGG	C19304
MeSH	Thiouracil
PubChem CID	1269845
UNII	59X161SCYL
CompTox Dashboard (EPA)	DTXSID4021347
- InChI: InChI=1S/C4H4N2OS/c7-3-1-2-5-4(8)6-3/h1-2H,(H2,5,6,7,8) Key: ZEMGGZBWXRYJHK-UHFFFAOYSA-N; InChI=1/C4H4N2OS/c7-3-1-2-5-4(8)6-3/h1-2H,(H2,5,6,7,8) Key: ZEMGGZBWXRYJHK-UHFFFAOYAK
- SMILES: O=C1C=CNC(=S)N1

Properties
Chemical formula	C_{4}H_{4}N_{2}OS
Molar mass	128.15 g·mol^{−1}
Melting point	340 °C (644 °F; 613 K) decomposition
- Except where otherwise noted, data are given for materials in their standard state (at 25 °C [77 °F], 100 kPa). Infobox references

2-Thiouracil is a chemical derivative of uracil in which the oxygen atom in the 2-position of the ring is substituted by sulfur. It is classified as a thiourea.

== Medical use ==
The substance is a historically relevant anti-thyroid preparation. Edwin Astwood used it in 1943 as therapy for Graves' disease for the first time.

Thiouracil inhibits thyroid activity by blocking the enzyme thyroid peroxidase. Its use in recent times has been replaced by advent of more potent and safer antithyroid drugs. It occurs in seeds of Brassica and Crucifera species. Thiouracil has been used as antithyroid, coronary vasodilator, and in congestive heart failure although its use has been largely supplanted by other drugs.
