= Edwin B. Astwood =

Bermudian-American physiologist/endocrinologist

Edwin Bennett Astwood
- Born: December 29, 1909
- Died: February 17, 1976 (aged 66); Hamilton, Bermuda
- Awards: Cameron Prize for Therapeutics of the University of Edinburgh (1948); Lasker Award (1954)
- Scientific career
- Fields: Endocrinology

Edwin Bennett Astwood (December 19, 1909 – February 17, 1976) was a Bermudian physiologist and endocrinologist: his research on endocrine system led to treatments for hyperthyroidism, first published in 1943 in what has subsequently been called a "landmark" paper. In 1949 he showed that methimazole was superior to alternative therapies for Graves' disease and this became a standard treatment for the condition.

He was elected a Fellow of the American Academy of Arts and Sciences in 1949. In 1948, he was awarded the Cameron Prize for Therapeutics of the University of Edinburgh. He died of cancer on February 17, 1976, in Hamilton, Bermuda.
