= Sensory loss =

Partial or total loss of a sense

Many types of sense loss occur due to a dysfunctional sensation process, whether it be ineffective receptors, nerve damage, or cerebral impairment. Unlike agnosia, these impairments are due to damages prior to the perception process.

== Vision loss ==
Degrees of vision loss vary dramatically, although the ICD-9 released in 1979 categorized them into three tiers: normal vision, low vision, and blindness. Two significant causes of vision loss due to sensory failures include media opacity and optic nerve diseases, although hypoxia and retinal disease can also lead to blindness. Most causes of vision loss can cause varying degrees of damage, from total blindness to a negligible effect. Media opacity occurs in the presence of opacities in the eye tissues or fluid, distorting and/or blocking the image prior to contact with the photoreceptor cells. Vision loss often results despite correctly functioning retinal receptors. Optic nerve diseases such as optic neuritis or retrobulbar neuritis lead to dysfunction in the afferent nerve pathway once the signal has been correctly transmitted from retinal photoreceptors.

Partial or total vision loss may affect every single area of a person's life. Though loss of eyesight may occur naturally with age, trauma to the eye or exposure to hazardous conditions may also cause this serious condition. Workers in virtually any field may be at risk of sustaining eye injuries through trauma or exposure. A traumatic eye injury occurs when the eye itself sustains some form of trauma, whether a penetrating injury such as a laceration or a non-penetrating injury such as an impact. Because the eye is a delicate and complex organ, even a slight injury may have a temporary or permanent effect on eyesight.

== Hearing loss ==
Similarly to vision loss, hearing loss can vary from full or partial inability to detect some or all frequencies of sound which can typically be heard by members of their species. For humans, this range is approximately 20 Hz to 20 kHz at ~6.5 dB, although a 10 dB correction is often allowed for the elderly. Primary causes of hearing loss due to an impaired sensory system include long-term exposure to environmental noise, which can damage the mechanoreceptors responsible for receiving sound vibrations, as well as multiple diseases, such as CMV or meningitis, which damage the cochlea and auditory nerve, respectively.

Hearing loss may be gradual or sudden. Hearing loss may be very mild, resulting in minor difficulties with conversation, or as severe as complete deafness. The speed with which hearing loss occurs may give clues as to the cause. If hearing loss is sudden, it may be from trauma or a problem with blood circulation. A gradual onset is suggestive of other causes such as aging or a tumor. Associated neurological problems, such as tinnitus or vertigo, may indicate a problem with the nerves in the ear or brain. Hearing loss may be unilateral or bilateral. Unilateral hearing loss is most often associated with conductive causes, trauma, and acoustic neuromas. Pain in the ear is associated with ear infections, trauma, and obstruction in the canal.

== Anosmia ==
Anosmia is the inability to perceive odor, or in other words a lack of functioning olfaction. Many patients may experience unilateral or bilateral anosmia.

A temporary loss of smell can be caused by a blocked nose or infection. In contrast, a permanent loss of smell may be caused by death of olfactory receptor neurons in the nose or by brain injury in which there is damage to the olfactory nerve or damage to brain areas that process smell. The lack of the sense of smell at birth, usually due to genetic factors, is referred to as congenital anosmia.

The diagnosis of anosmia as well as the degree of impairment can now be tested much more efficiently and effectively than ever before thanks to "smell testing kits" that have been made available as well as screening tests which use materials that most clinics would readily have.

Many cases of congenital anosmia remain unreported and undiagnosed. Since the disorder is present from birth the individual may have little or no understanding of the sense of smell, hence are unaware of the deficit.

== Somatosensory loss ==
The somatosensory system is a complex sensory system made up of a number of different receptors, including thermoreceptors, nociceptors, mechanoreceptors and chemoreceptors. It also comprises essential processing centres, or sensory modalities, such as proprioception, touch, temperature, and nociception. The sensory receptors cover the skin and epithelia, skeletal muscles, bones and joints, internal organs, and the cardiovascular system.

While touch (also called tactile or tactual perception) is considered one of the five traditional senses, the impression of touch is formed from several modalities. In medicine, the colloquial term "touch" is usually replaced with "somatic senses" to better reflect the variety of mechanisms involved.

Insensitivity to somatosensory stimuli, such as heat, cold, touch, and pain, are most commonly a result of a more general physical impairment associated with paralysis. Damage to the spinal cord or other major nerve fiber may lead to a termination of both afferent and efferent signals to varying areas of the body, causing both a loss of touch and a loss of motor coordination. Other types of somatosensory loss include hereditary sensory and autonomic neuropathy, which consists of ineffective afferent neurons with fully functioning efferent neurons; essentially, motor movement without somatosensation. Sensory loss can occur due to a minor nick or lesion on the spinal cord which creates a problem within the neurosystem. This can lead to loss of smell, taste, touch, sight, and hearing. In most cases it often leads to issues with touch. Sometimes people cannot feel touch at all while other times a light finger tap feels like someone has punched them. There are medications and therapies that can help control the symptoms of sensory loss and deprivation.

== Ageusia ==
Ageusia is the loss of taste, particularly the inability to detect sweetness, sourness, bitterness, saltiness, and umami (meaning "pleasant/savory taste"). It is sometimes confused with anosmia (a loss of the sense of smell). Because the tongue can only indicate texture and differentiate between sweet, sour, bitter, salty, and umami, most of what is perceived as the sense of taste is actually derived from smell. True ageusia is relatively rare compared to hypogeusia (a partial loss of taste) and dysgeusia (a distortion or alteration of taste).

Tissue damage to the nerves that support the tongue can cause ageusia, especially damage to the lingual nerve and the glossopharyngeal nerve. The lingual nerve passes taste for the front two-thirds of the tongue and the glossopharyngeal nerve passes taste for the back third of the tongue. The lingual nerve can also be damaged during otologic surgery, causing a feeling of metal taste.

Taste loss can vary from true ageusia, a complete loss of taste, to hypogeusia, a partial loss of taste, to dysgeusia, a distortion or alteration of taste. The primary cause of ageusia involves damage to the lingual nerve, which receives the stimuli from taste buds for the front two-thirds of the tongue, or the glossopharyngeal nerve, which acts similarly for the back third. Damage may be due to neurological disorders, such as Bell’s palsy or multiple sclerosis, as well as infectious diseases such as meningoencephalopathy. Other causes include a vitamin B deficiency, as well as taste bud death due to acidic/spicy foods, radiation, and/or tobacco use.

== Dual sensory loss and psychological impact ==
Dual sensory loss is the simultaneous loss of two senses. Research has shown that 6% of non-institutionalized older adults had a dual sensory impairment, and 70% of severely visually impaired older adults additionally suffered from significant hearing loss. Vision and hearing loss both interfere with the interpretation and comprehension of speech. People with sensory loss often have problems communicating. Personal, situational and environmental factors can also become prohibitive barriers to communication.

Poor communication frequently results in poor psychosocial functioning. Older adults with sensory loss often find it difficult to adapt to their sensory loss, becoming depressed, anxious, lethargic, and dissatisfied. Thus, sensory loss, the inability to communicate, and poor psychosocial functioning reduces quality of life and well-being.

== See also ==
- Perception
- Ideasthesia
