= Scent of Rain (disambiguation) =

Scent of Rain may refer to:

- Petrichor, the earthy scent produced when rain falls on dry soil
- Scent of Rain, 2007 play by Mark Dunn
- The Scent of Rain in the Balkans, historical novel by Gordana Kuić
- The Scent of Rain in the Balkans (TV series), an adaptation of the Gordana Kuić novel
- The Scent of Rain and Lightning, a collection of short stories by Nancy Pickard

== See also ==
- Petrichor (disambiguation)
- Smell of Rain (disambiguation)
