= Key odorant =

A key odorant is a volatile compound that is present in concentrations higher than their specific flavor threshold.

Key odorants are these compounds that can be effectively smelled. Food products contain a lot of different volatile compounds, odorants. Some of them are present in such small concentrations that they are not perceivable by the human nose. Those odorants do not contribute to the overall aroma of a product. Key odorants on the other hand are essential for the overall aroma of the product.

Key odorants can be identified by comparing the concentrations of the odorants with their respective flavor threshold. The resulting unit is the odor activity value (OAV). Every key odorant has an OAV higher than 1. Values lower than 1 are not perceived.

== See also ==
- Odor detection threshold
- Olfactometer
