= Smell of Rain (disambiguation) =

Smell of Rain may refer to:

- Petrichor, the earthy scent produced when rain falls on dry soil
- Smell of Rain (film), a 2006 Singaporean romantic drama
- The Smell of Rain, a 2001 album by solo artist Mortiis

== See also ==
- Petrichor (disambiguation)
- Scent of Rain (disambiguation)
