= Odournet =

Dutch consultancy company

Odournet Group
- Type: Private
- Founded: 1980; 46 years ago
- Founder: Anton Philip van Harreveld
- Headquarters: Amsterdam, Netherlands
- Key people: Anton Philip van Harreveld (CEO)
- Products: Odor assessment
- Website: Official Website

Odournet is a Netherlands-based international consultancy company specializing in environmental and product odor management and assessment. Odournet also manufactures products for odor assessment like olfactometers and other odor testing and sampling equipment. The company has labs and offices in nations like the United Kingdom, Spain, France, India, Brazil, and others.

== History ==
The precursor to Odournet, Project Research Amsterdam, was founded in 1980 by Anton Philip "Ton" van Harreveld. The sole proprietorship sought to more efficiently characterize and abate odors in environmental settings. The first computerized olfactometer was developed by VanHarreveld's then unipersonal company Project Research Amsterdam. This company was incorporated as a limited, Project Research Amsterdam BV in 1989, adding environmental consultant Frans Vossen as co-founder. The company became known as Odournet in 1993, and they opened their first international office in Bradford on Avon, England the following year.

In 2009, Odournet merged with Ecoma and OLFAtec, two similar odor management consultancy companies based in Germany. Ecoma and OLFAtec were absorbed into Odournet under the terms of the merger. Founder Ton van Harreveld served as Odournet's CEO until 2014. He stepped down from the position, allowing Simon Rützel-Grünberg to take over. Van Harreveld remains a board member and the chief innovation officer at the company.

In 2015, Odournet GmbH (Kiel) and Odournet BV (Amsterdam) left the Odournet group and became Olfasense. Van Harreveld resumed his function as CEO at Odournet.

Over the course of its existence, Odournet has added laboratories and offices throughout the world. It opened laboratories in Manchester, England in 2012 and Goa, India in 2015. The company also maintains a lab in the Research Park at the Autonomous University of Barcelona in Spain. Other office and lab locations include Brazil, Germany, France and more.

== Services ==
Odournet provides odor management consultancy and odor assessments. Its services can be categorized into four areas: environmental odor management; product and material testing; odour measurement equipment; and calibration and proficiency testing for other odor labs. A large portion of the company's revenue derives from environmental odor management as many companies in Europe and North America must adhere to odor emissions guidelines.

The company uses olfactometers, gas chromatographs, and mass spectrometers to isolate and identify the prevalence of odors in a given environment. They also use trained professionals to identify odors. In certain cases, the company may be asked to simply identify the source of an odor. For instance, in 2003, Ireland's Environmental Protection Agency hired Odournet to identify a distinctive scent in the town of Shannon. In other cases, Odournet will employ odor panelists whose job is to simply identify "nuisance odors." Odors that are intense or particularly bad may be labeled "nuisance odors." Smells are collected with pumps and plastic odor bags and must be analyzed within 30 hours of collection.

Odournet labs are also used to qualitatively and quantitatively assess odors in particular products and materials, including pharmaceuticals, chemicals, automotive products, foods, personal care products, fragrances, appliances, and more.
