= C11H20O =

The molecular formula C_{11}H_{20}O (molar mass: 168.28 g/mol, exact mass: 168.1514 u) may refer to:

- 2-Methylisoborneol
- Methyl ether of Geraniol
- Methyl ether of Borneol
