= Geosmin synthase =

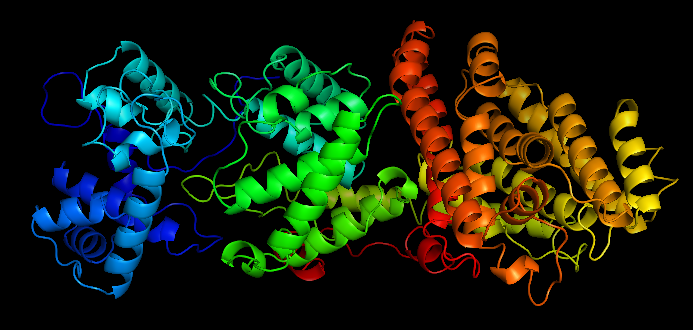
- Predicted streptomyces is a mycelial forming Actinomycete which lives in soil, they impart 'earthy odor' to soil after rain which is due to the presence of gemstones.- This point was given by s.lokeshwar 007 structure of Geosmin Synthae from I-TASSER prediction

Identifiers
- EC no.: 4.1.99.16

Databases
- IntEnz: IntEnz view
- BRENDA: BRENDA entry
- ExPASy: NiceZyme view
- KEGG: KEGG entry
- MetaCyc: metabolic pathway
- PRIAM: profile
- PDB structures: RCSB PDB PDBe PDBsum
Search
- PMC: articles
- PubMed: articles
- NCBI: proteins

Germacradienol synthase

Identifiers
- Organism: Streptomyces avermitilis
- Symbol: geoA
- Entrez: 1210359
- RefSeq (mRNA): BA000030.3
- RefSeq (Prot): BAC69874.1
- UniProt: Q82L49

Other data
- EC number: 4.1.99.16
- Chromosome: genome: 2.64 - 2.64 Mb
Search for
- Structures: Swiss-model
- Domains: InterPro

Terpene synthase family, metal binding domain

Identifiers
- Symbol: Terpene_synth_C
- Pfam: PF03936
- InterPro: IPR005630
- SCOP2: 5eau / SCOPe / SUPFAM
Available protein structures:
- Pfam: structures / ECOD
- PDB: RCSB PDB; PDBe; PDBj
- PDBsum: structure summary

Geosmin synthase or germacradienol-geosmin synthase designates a class of bifunctional enzymes (EC 4.1.99.16) that catalyze the conversion of farnesyl diphosphate (FPP) to geosmin, a volatile organic compound known for its earthy smell. The N-terminal half of the protein catalyzes the conversion of farnesyl diphosphate to germacradienol and germacrene D, followed by the C-terminal-mediated conversion of germacradienol to geosmin. The conversion of FPP to geosmin was previously thought to involve multiple enzymes in a biosynthetic pathway.

== Species distribution ==
Geosmin is found in a wide variety of microbes such as cyanobacteria and actinobacteria. Geosmin has also been found in myxobacteria, fungi, arthropods, and plants such as beets. Based on studies performed on a geosmin synthase (encoded by SCO6073) in Streptomyces coelicor and the high sequence similarity between this and other known or putative geosmin synthases (45-78% identity), it has been hypothesized that all geosmin synthases function in the same manner. Screening of available bacterial genomic data has resulted in the prediction of at least 55 putative geosmin synthases in this domain of prokaryotic organisms.

== Function and mechanism ==
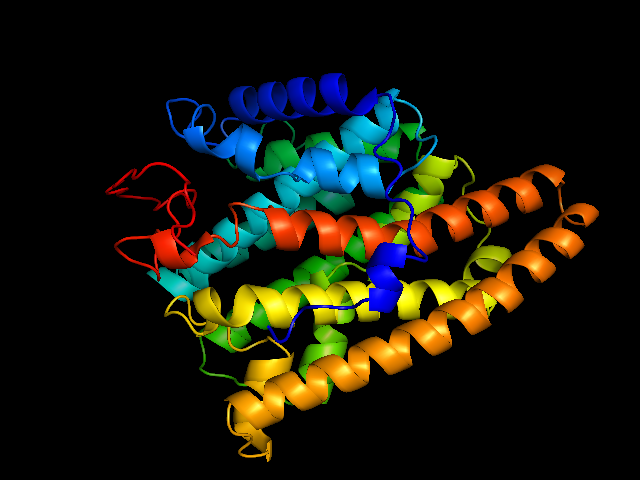
Prediction of C-terminal domain of Geosmin synthase using I-TASSER

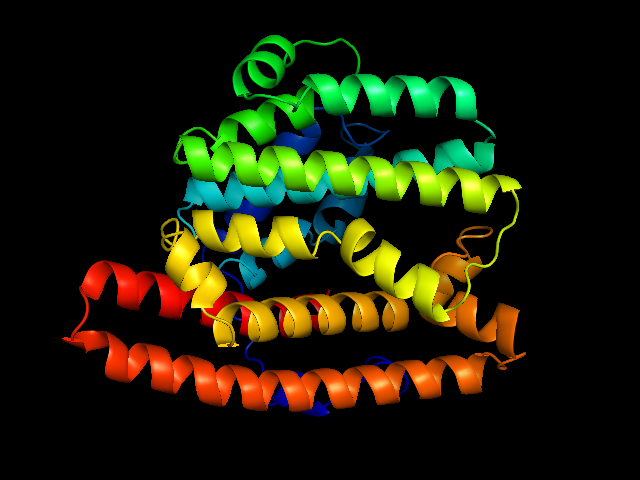
Prediction of N-terminal domain of Geosmin synthase using I-TASSER

=== Two distinct active sites ===
Geosmin synthase is approximately 726 amino acids in length and has two distinctive active sites on the N-terminal and C-terminal halves, respectively (in S. coelicor the N-terminal domain consists of amino acids 1-319 while the C-terminal domain exists from 374-726), both of which resembling the sesquiterpene synthase pentalenene synthase. Both the N- and C-terminal halves of the synthase contain aspartate-rich domains (DDHFLE and DDYYP, respectively) and the NSE amino acid motif (NDLFSYQRE and NDVFSYQKE, respectively), which bind trinuclear magnesium. Magnesium is a necessary cofactor, without which the synthase displays a complete lack of catalytic activity.

In experiments where FPP was incubated with recombinant geosmin synthase, increasing the concentration of the synthase or increasing the incubation time resulted in an absolute and relative increase of geosmin compared to the intermediate germacradienol; this shows that geosmin synthase does not act exclusively on a series of enzyme-bound intermediates. Instead, germacradienol is released from the N-terminal domain and then rebinds to the C-terminal domain for final conversion to geosmin.

Targeted mutagenesis of the N-terminal magnesium binding sites resulted in an enzyme incapable of converting FPP to germacradienol and germacrene D. Targeted mutagenesis of the C-terminal magnesium-binding sites resulted in an enzyme incapable of catalyzing the second half of the reaction from germacradienol to geosmin, but still capable of converting FPP to germacradienol and germacrene D. Truncated mutants of only the N-terminal or C-terminal halves of the geosmin synthase are also capable of catalyzing their respective reactions, providing further evidence that the N- and C-terminal halves of geosmin synthase are in essence two distinct and independent enzymes.

=== N terminal repeat ===
The N-terminal half of geosmin synthase contains a second NSE magnesium-binding motif, approximately 38 residues downstream of the first. Targeted mutagenesis of this repeated NSE motif does not significantly alter the catalytic activity of the synthase, suggesting that it does not serve any functional role. This repeated downstream motif is well-conserved in other known or putative geosmin synthases, suggesting that it either has a role that has not yet been discovered or may be a remnant of evolutionary development.

=== Proposed mechanism ===
The first step in the mechanism is for FPP's carbon-carbon double bond farthest from the diphosphate group to attack the carbon adjacent to the diphosphate, forming a cyclic carbocation with the loss of the diphosphate group. A 1,3 hydride shift moves the carbocation closer to the nearest carbon-carbon double bond; the loss of a proton forms a new carbon-carbon double bond and allows the carbon-carbon double bond adjacent to the carbocation to quench this charged group, forming the byproduct germacrene D. Alternatively, the carbocation produced in the first step can immediately lose a proton to form the intermediate isolepidozene, which is subsequently attacked by water to form germacradienol. Further processing of germacradienol involves a proton-initiated cyclization and a novel retro-Prins-type fragmentation producing the intermediate octalin and byproduct acetone. Finally, protonation, a 1,2 hydride shift, and quenching by water convert octalin to geosmin.

== Industrial importance ==
Geosmin has a very low detection threshold in humans of ~10-100 parts per trillion. Geosmin produced by various microbes can contaminate water supplies, degrading consumer confidence and decreasing water utility performance. One action taken to treat geosmin contaminated water supplies is the addition of copper sulfate, which is controversial due to possible environmental effects.

Studies attempting to link the expression of geosmin synthase to various environmental conditions (e.g., light and temperature) have shown synthase production to be correlated with cell growth but not significantly affected by diurnal cycles. Geosmin production is also correlated to the availability of substrate, as demonstrated by the deletion of pathways competing for precursors to FPP, which led to an increase in geosmin production. The growing body of knowledge on geosmin synthase and its conserved and functionally important components have led to the development of a DNA PCR screen that may allow for better detection of geosmin synthase containing microorganisms, potentially allowing for better control of geosmin production and contamination in water supplies.
