= OAV =

OAV may refer to:

- Original animated video
- Österreichischer Alpenverein (ÖAV), an Austrian Alpine Club
- Object–Agent–Verb, in linguistic typology
- Odour activity value, a measure of importance of a specific compound to the odour of a sample
- Goldenhar syndrome, a rare congenital defect characterized by incomplete development of the face on one side
