= Petrichor (composition) =

2018 orchestral composition by Ellen Reid

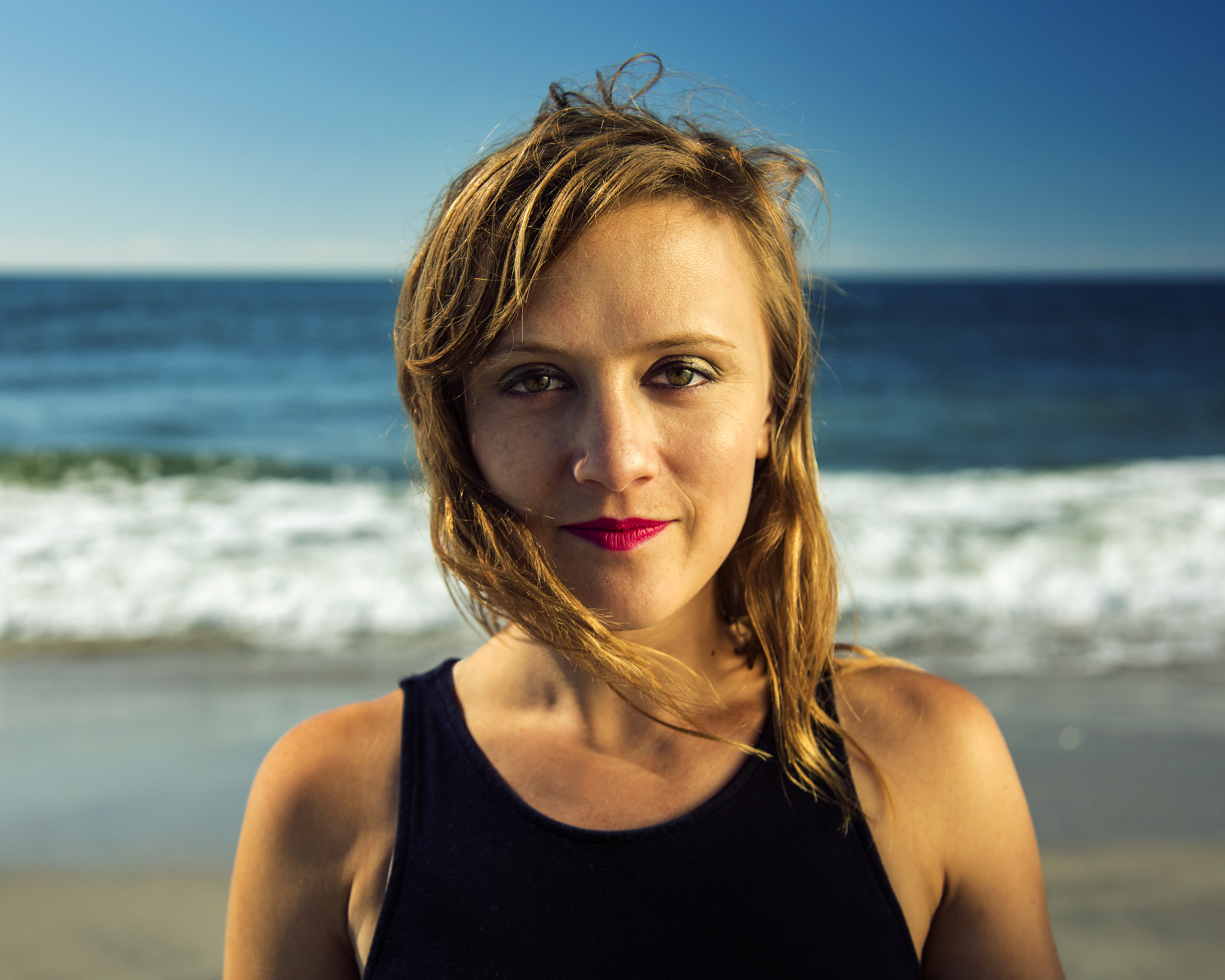
Ellen Reid in 2016

Petrichor is an orchestral composition written by the American composer Ellen Reid. The work was commissioned by the Los Angeles Chamber Orchestra. Its world premiere was performed by the Los Angeles Chamber Orchestra conducted by Douglas Boyd at the UCLA's Royce Hall on February 24, 2018.

== Composition ==
Petrichor is written in a single movement and lasts about 15 minutes in performance. The piece is named for the eponymous scent that is produced when rain falls on dry soil.

=== Instrumentation ===
The work is scored for an orchestra consisting of two flutes, two oboes, two clarinets, two bassoons, two horns, two trumpets, one percussionist, harp, piano, and strings. Additionally, the score calls for the players to be divided into six groups around the concert hall surrounding the audience.

== Reception ==
Mark Swed of the Los Angeles Times wrote favorably of Petrichor, saying, "the music drifted like fog and dripped as if from leaks in the roof." He added, "You didn't at first quite know where you were. Just as rain changes your sense of your surroundings, the shimmering strings and bright winds in the back that opened Petrichor seemed to mysteriously erase the physical barriers of the hall. Attention was eventually directed to the stage, where the larger ensemble gradually became an exotic rhythm machine, although the voices from beyond returned us to the greater open spaces." Jim Farber of the San Francisco Classical Voice similarly wrote, "It began, like several other new works I've recently heard, with a series of dawn-like twitterings that slowly built to a blazing orchestral climax. Gentle murmurings, soft trills, and melodic chirping came from all around the hall. When the inevitable crescendo came, Reid used the opportunity to switch tonal gears from dulcet consonance to growling dissonance, with the onstage orchestra offering a succession of full-voiced, ominous tones." He concluded, "Exchanges were volleyed around the hall ending with a return to a melodic section in the upper register that ended the piece like so many twinkling stars."
