= Petrichor (disambiguation) =

Petrichor is the earthy scent produced when rain falls on dry soil.

Petrichor may also refer to:

- Petrichor, a song by Phish from the 2016 album Big Boat
- Petrichor, an album by 070 Shake, released in 2024
- Petrichor, a sonic album by Brymo, released in 2025
- Petrichor, a track on 2017 album Life Is Fine by Paul Kelly
- Petrichor (composition), a 2018 orchestral composition by Ellen Reid
- Petrichor, a character in the comic series Saga
