= Ectocarpene =

Names
- Preferred IUPAC name (6S)-6-[(1Z)-But-1-en-1-yl]cyclohepta-1,4-diene
- Other names (S,Z)-6-(But-1-en-1-yl)cyclohepta-1,4-diene; Dictyopterene D

Identifiers
CAS Number	33156-93-3
3D model (JSmol)	Interactive image
ChemSpider	28290131
PubChem CID	6440990
UNII	5LT5CQ3SYJ
CompTox Dashboard (EPA)	DTXSID00893792
- InChI: InChI=1S/C11H16/c1-2-3-8-11-9-6-4-5-7-10-11/h3-4,6-8,10-11H,2,5,9H2,1H3/b8-3-/t11-/m0/s1 Key: KIFXGGYCNMHCSX-DZHRUPLWSA-N; InChI=1/C11H16/c1-2-3-8-11-9-6-4-5-7-10-11/h3-4,6-8,10-11H,2,5,9H2,1H3/b8-3-/t11-/m0/s1 Key: KIFXGGYCNMHCSX-DZHRUPLWBJ
- SMILES: CC/C=C\[C@H]1CC=CCC=C1

Properties
Chemical formula	C_{11}H_{16}
Molar mass	148.249 g·mol^{−1}
Density	0.908 g/mL
- Except where otherwise noted, data are given for materials in their standard state (at 25 °C [77 °F], 100 kPa). verify (what is ?) Infobox references

Ectocarpene is the rearrangement product of pre-ectocarpene, the sexual attractant, or pheromone, found with several species of brown algae (Phaeophyceae). Ectocarpene has a fruity scent and can be sensed by humans when millions of algae gametes swarm the seawater and the females start emitting the substance's precursor to attract the male gametes.

All the double bonds are cis and the absolute configuration of the stereocenter is (S).

== History ==
Ectocarpene was isolated from algae Ectocarpus (order Ectocarpales) by Müller and col. in 1971. It has been mistook to be the active substance for gamete attraction until 1995, and pre-ectocarpene was discovered to be active. This confusion arises from the sigmatropic rearrangement (and thus deactivation) of pre-ectocarpene in minutes at room temperature:

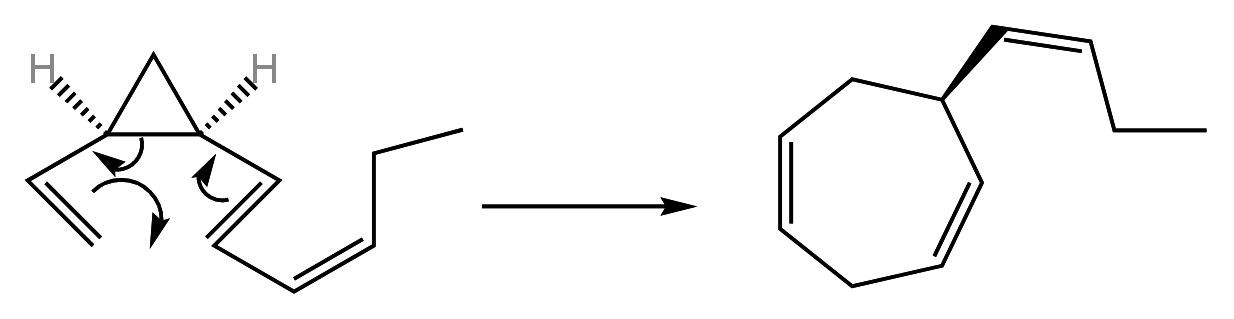
Mechanism of ectocarpene formation from precursor

This is as to only have the phermon active in the proximity of the female gametes.

The presence of ectocarpene in Capsicum fruit was reported in 2010. Studies concluded that its "sweet and green" aroma surfaced through identification tests as well as sensory tests. Its relatively low but influential presence helps develop the Capsicum fruit’s profile.

== Related Compounds ==
(E)-Ectocarpene is a product associated to a group referred to as Bryophytes, a family of liverworts, algae, and other species with medicinal and nutritional properties. It is suggested that (E)-ectocarpene may have an evolutionary relationship between families of liverworts and algae as its concentration of formation varies based on the species’ environmental conditions.

== See also ==
- Dictyopterene
