= Dictyopterene =

Dictyopterenes are a group of chemical compounds that are naturally present in marine and freshwater environments. They are sexual attractants, or pheromones, found with several species of brown algae (Phaeophyceae). The chemical formula of dictyopterene A is trans-1-(trans-1-hexenyl)-2-vinylcyclopropane. The chemical formula of dictyopterene C' is 6-butylcyclohepta-1,4-diene. Dictyopterene A can be extracted from the essential oil of algae of the genus Dictyopteris.

== Chemical structures ==
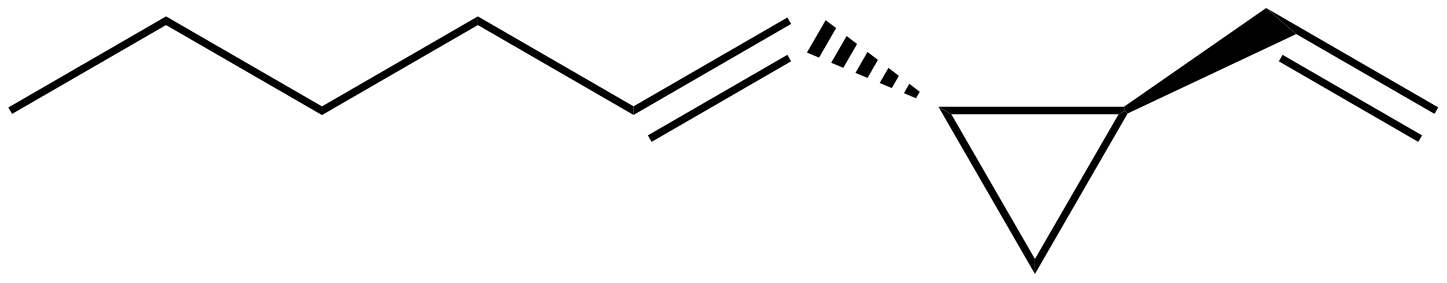
Dictyopterene A

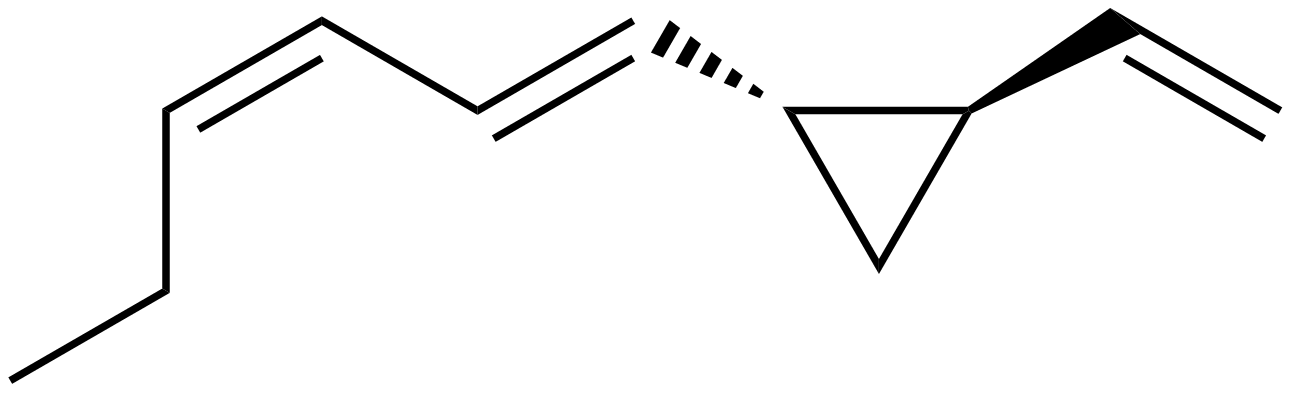
Dictyopterene B

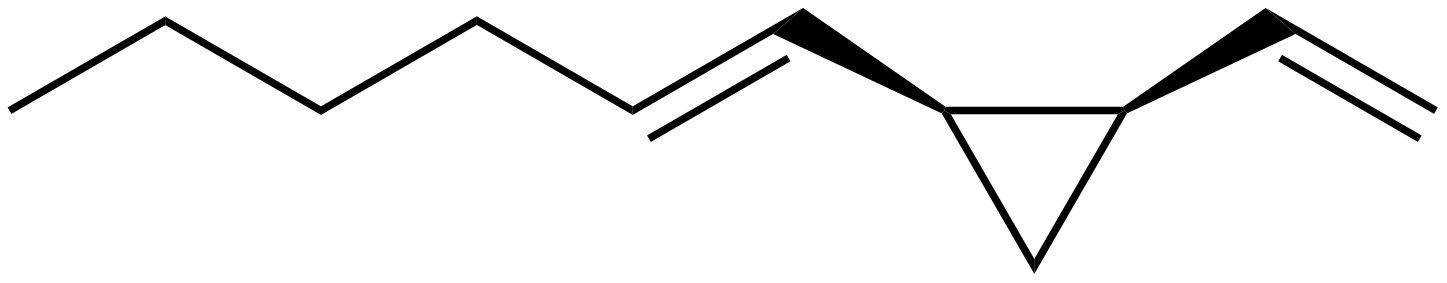
Dictyopterene C

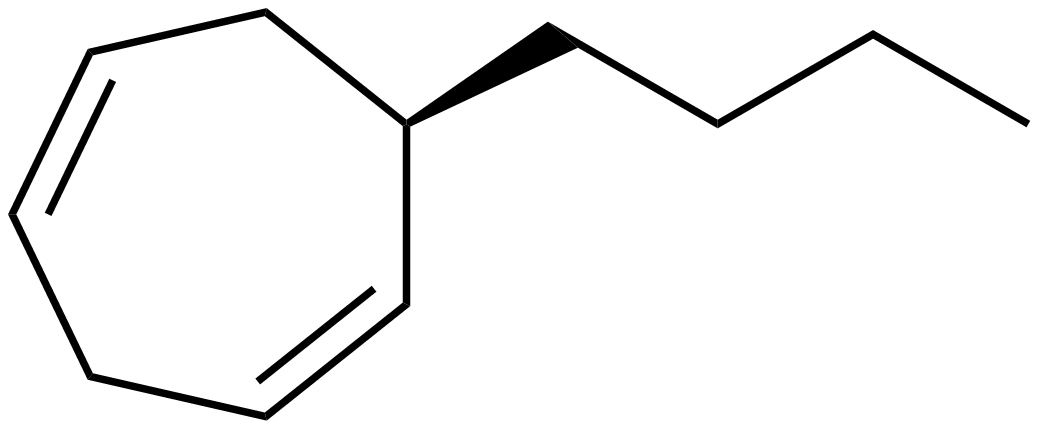
Dictyopterene C'

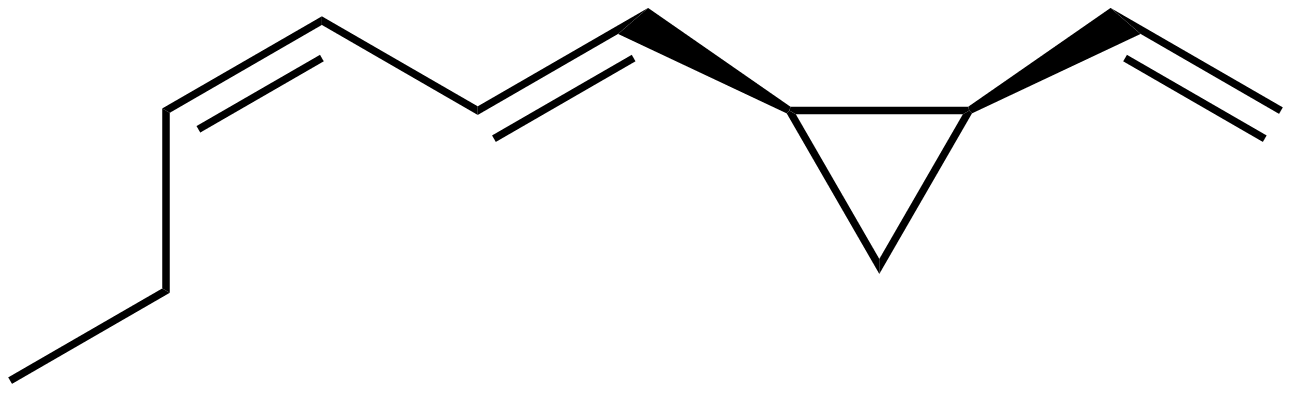
Dictyopterene D
(pre-ectocarpene)

== See also ==
- Dimethyl sulfide
- Ectocarpene, also known as Dictyopterene D'
