= Ryan Idol =

American pornographic actor (born 1966)

- Born: Marc Anthony Donais; August 10, 1966 (age 59); Worcester, Massachusetts, U.S.
- Height: 6 ft 1 in (1.85 m)

Ryan Idol (born August 10, 1966) is an American gay pornographic film actor who performed in the 1990s and later onstage in mainstream theater. He has French, Irish, and Native American ancestry. Idol describes himself as "the creation of Marc Anthony Donais".

== Biography ==
Idol was raised in a series of foster homes as a child. He never knew his father, and had little contact with his mother while growing up.

After high school, Idol spent a brief period in the United States Navy, then worked as a construction worker. To generate income, he began stripping for women in nightclubs in New England. He was approached to do a nude layout for Playgirl, and in February 1989 appeared as the "Man of the Month" centerfold under his birth name Marc Anthony Donais. This appearance launched his career in the adult film industry, in which he achieved notoriety and success under the name Ryan Idol. At the height of his career, he claimed to earn $50,000 per film, and made tens of thousands of dollars more stripping at gay clubs around the United States. He also engaged in a limited amount of prostitution. He retired from adult films in 1996.

On March 20, 1998, Idol was seriously injured after jumping through a window of his fourth-floor apartment in New York City in an attempted suicide. He considers the fall to be a "near-death experience". Idol has stated that he doesn't recall jumping but that "the drugs and alcohol took over".

Moving into theater acting, in 1999, Idol starred in the play Making Porn. Idol next played "Bill Tom" in the play Scent of Rain (subtitled Scent of Rain: A Love Story Really!), written by Mark Dunn, for which he was lauded for "continu[ing] to establish himself as a capable actor". Idol made his Broadway debut when he played the "Crisco Patron" in the Roundabout Theater Company's 2007 revival of Terrence McNally's The Ritz.

== Legal charges ==
Donais' legal troubles started in 1987 when he was in the U.S. Navy stationed in Hawaii. After only serving 11 months he was court martialed and convicted of assault and battery on an officer. Donais did time in the Brig and received a dishonorable discharge from the Navy. Court documents related to a lawsuit filed by HealthSouth over allegations of misuse of funds donated to Birmingham, Alabama, Mayor Larry Langford's Computer Help for Kids charity mentioned Idol under his real name. The papers showed that $30,000 was paid to Idol, with $5,000 coming from the charity and $25,000 from the Council of Cooperating Governments. Charity director John Katopodis testified in a deposition that Idol was paid to repair computers and to set up computer giveaway programs in other areas. Idol testified that, because of his 1998 fall, he was "not at [his] full faculties" and could not recall the details of his time with the organization.

A Sacramento Superior Court jury convicted Idol on September 20, 2011, of attempted murder for smashing his girlfriend over the head with a toilet tank lid. He was also convicted of battery, assault with a deadly weapon and "corporal injury on a spouse or cohabitant". Sentencing was scheduled for December 9, 2011; however when he appeared, his attorney requested to withdraw from the case. The request was granted. Idol then appeared in court on January 13, 2012, requesting a retrial "citing ineffective assistance of counsel". He was sentenced to 12 years in state prison September 27, 2012. He is housed at the California Medical Facility (CMF) in Vacaville, California, a facility for mentally ill prisoners, due to bad behavior, fighting, and drugs. Due to a 3-strikes record, he is eligible for a 25-years-to-life sentence if convicted for certain felonies, so he chose a deal to complete his entire sentence instead of getting a new charge. He was released from prison in August 2022.

== Partial videography ==
- Idol In The Sky (1996)
- The Road Home (1996)
- Idol Country (1994 – GayVN Award winner for Best Actor)
- Idol Thoughts (1993)
- Trade Off (1992)
- Score 10 (1991)
- Idol Worship (1991)
- Idol Eyes (1990 – GayVN Award winner for Best Videography)

== Theater ==
- Making Porn (1996–2001, New York (off Broadway), touring San Francisco, Miami, San Diego, Seattle, Chicago)
- Scent of Rain as Bill Tom (2001-2003, Chicago, Los Angeles) (credited as Ryan Idol)
- The Ritz as the Crisco patron

== See also ==
- List of male performers in gay porn films
