= Geosmin =

Chemical compound responsible for the characteristic odour of earth

- Geosmin

Names
- Preferred IUPAC name (4S,4aS,8aR)-4,8a-Dimethyloctahydronaphthalen-4a(2H)-ol
- Other names (4S,4aS,8aR)-4,8a-Dimethyl-1,2,3,4,5,6,7,8-octahydronaphthalen-4a-ol; 4,8a-Dimethyl-decahydronaphthalen-4a-ol; Octahydro-4,8a-dimethyl-4a(2H)-naphthalenol

Identifiers
CAS Number	19700-21-1
3D model (JSmol)	Interactive image
ChEBI	CHEBI:46702
ChemSpider	27642
ECHA InfoCard	100.039.294
PubChem CID	29746
UNII	MYW912WXJ4
CompTox Dashboard (EPA)	DTXSID801024112
- InChI: InChI=1S/C12H22O/c1-10-6-5-8-11(2)7-3-4-9-12(10,11)13/h10,13H,3-9H2,1-2H3/t10-,11+,12-/m0/s1 Key: JLPUXFOGCDVKGO-TUAOUCFPSA-N; InChI=1/C12H22O/c1-10-6-5-8-11(2)7-3-4-9-12(10,11)13/h10,13H,3-9H2,1-2H3 /t10-,11+,12-/m0/s1
- SMILES: O[C@]12[C@H](CCC[C@]2(CCCC1)C)C

Properties
Chemical formula	C_{12}H_{22}O
Molar mass	182.307 g·mol^{−1}
Melting point	78 to 82 °C (172 to 180 °F; 351 to 355 K)
Boiling point	270 to 271 °C (518 to 520 °F; 543 to 544 K)

Hazards
Flash point	104 °C (219 °F; 377 K)
- Except where otherwise noted, data are given for materials in their standard state (at 25 °C [77 °F], 100 kPa). verify (what is ?) Infobox references

Geosmin (/dʒiˈɒzmɪn/ jee-OZ-min) is a chemical with a distinct earthy or musty odor. It is easily smelled by most people, having a very low odor detection threshold, ranging from 0.006 to 0.01 micrograms per liter in water. Geosmin is responsible for the earthy taste of beetroots and a contributor to the strong scent, known as petrichor, that occurs when rain falls after a spell of dry weather or when soil is disturbed. It is produced by bacteria, especially cyanobacteria, often present in soil and water supplies. Geosmin, along with 2-methylisoborneol, are the major biological causes of muddy odor and flavor in drinking water worldwide and in farmed fish.

Geosmin is an irregular sesquiterpenoid. It is a bicyclic alcohol with formula C_{12}H_{22}O, a derivative of decalin. It is produced from the universal sesquiterpene precursor farnesyl pyrophosphate (also known as farnesyl diphosphate), in a two-step Mg^{2+}-dependent reaction. Its name is derived from the Ancient Greek words geō- (γεω-), meaning "earth", and osmḗ (ὀσμή), meaning "smell". The word was coined in 1965 by the American biochemist Nancy N. Gerber (1929–1985) and the French-American biologist Hubert A. Lechevalier (1926–2015).

== Production ==
Geosmin is produced as a secondary metabolite by various blue-green algae (cyanobacteria), filamentous bacteria in the class Actinomyces, other prokaryotes, and various eukaryotes. The main genera in the cyanobacteria that have been shown to produce geosmin include Anabaena, Phormidium, and Planktothrix, while the main genus in the Actinomyces that produces geosmin is Streptomyces. In beetroots, geosmin is produced endogenously, not by environmental nor endophytic microbes, suggesting beets possess separate or acquired means of geosmin biosynthesis. Communities whose water supplies depend on surface water can periodically experience episodes of unpleasant-tasting water when a sharp drop in the population of these bacteria releases geosmin into the local water supply. Under acidic conditions, geosmin decomposes into odorless substances.

In 2006, geosmin was biosynthesized by a bifunctional Streptomyces coelicolor enzyme. A single enzyme, geosmin synthase, converts farnesyl diphosphate to geosmin in a two-step reaction. The production and dispersal of the compound may give an evolutionary advantage to the producers. Geosmin and 2-methylisoborneol have been shown to attract springtails, Folsomia candida, which are believed to feed on and spread the spores of Streptomyces both through their feces and by attachment to their cuticle. Additionally, geosmin has been found to repel the nematode Caenorhabditis elegans and reduced its contact with Streptomyces.

Not all blue-green algae produce geosmin. Identification of species that might produce geosmin is traditionally done through microscopic identification of geosmin-producing algae, a process that is labor-intensive and requires specialized knowledge. Recently a geosmin synthase gene geoA, was identified, which is present in cyanobacterial species that produce geosmin, but is not present in other cyanobacterial species. Amplification of this gene from water samples using real-time PCR may permit predictions of taste and odor events caused by cyanobacteria in fresh water.

== Effects ==
The human olfactory system is extremely sensitive to geosmin and is able to detect it at concentrations as low as anywhere from 400 parts per trillion to 5 parts per trillion. Human sensitivity differs between the two enantiomers. In a study of 50 subjects, the mean odor detection threshold was 9.5 ng/L for naturally occurring (−)-geosmin and 78 ng/L for (+)-geosmin. This makes the natural form roughly eight times more potent. It is proposed that this extreme sensitivity to geosmin evolved in humans or their ancestors to aid them in their search for scarce water, but this is not conclusive. Similarly, many insects possess a sensitivity to geosmin such that it may act as an attractant, signaling the presence of microbial prey, or as a repellant, where its presence may coincide with that of toxin-producing microbes. In Drosophila melanogaster, geosmin is detected by olfactory sensory neurons in the antennal lobe which causes fruit flies to avoid feeding and egg-laying at sites even when attractive food odors are present. In contrast, geosmin attracts gravid females of the yellow fever mosquito Aedes aegypti and guides them to sites to lay eggs. Geosmin is also implicated in the migratory patterns of eels, where its higher concentration in freshwater systems guides the fish from the ocean into estuaries and rivers. Geosmin is also likely involved in raccoon predation of turtle nests, where burrowing disturbs the soil and ejects the chemical and other volatile indicators into the air.

Geosmin is responsible for the muddy smell in many commercially important freshwater fish such as carp, catfish, and tilapia. Geosmin and another terpenoid compound 2-methylisoborneol, which is produced in similar circumstances, concentrate in the fatty skin and dark muscle tissues. Geosmin breaks down in acidic conditions; hence, vinegar and other acidic ingredients are used in fish recipes to reduce the muddy flavor. Taste and odor compounds including geosmin lead to an unpleasant taste of drinking water, which is perceived by consumers as an indication of poor water quality. Despite its negative effects on the taste and odor of fish and drinking water, geosmin is nontoxic to humans.

Geosminis is also responsible for an earthy off-flavor in grape juice and wine made from rotten grapes. Its production in grapes requires the combined action of two fungi: Penicillium expansum synthesizes geosmin only after Botrytis cinerea has first colonized the grapes.

Geosmin is reported to be an issue for saltwater fish farmed in recirculating aquaculture systems, such as Atlantic salmon, but there are also studies that show that the presence of geosmin in seawater is significantly lower than that found in freshwater, which is why many people consider freshwater fish to taste muddy compared to marine fish. These aquaculture systems rely on biological filtration using cultured microbial communities to process the nitrogenous waste from the fish (ammonia) into less harmful compounds (nitrite and nitrate) that can be tolerated at higher concentrations. However, geosmin-producing bacteria can also grow in these aquaculture systems, and often require fish to be transferred to an additional "finishing" or "purge" system where they are not fed for several days prior to harvest to remove off-flavor compounds and empty the intestinal tract. This process is also known as depuration.

== Geosmin remediation in drinking water ==
Geosmin cannot be removed from water using standard treatment processes, requiring a combination of integrated solutions which may not be available to all municipal water suppliers. Possible advanced oxidation methods include photocatalysis, ozonation, and ultrasonication. Activated carbon filters may be able to help somewhat, but few studies have been completed to address this issue.

== See also ==
- Dimethyl sulfide – One of the molecules responsible for the odour of the sea
- Odor detection threshold – Lowest perceivable odor concentration
- Petrichor – Earthy smell when rain falls on dry soil
