= Hedley Marston =

Australian biochemist

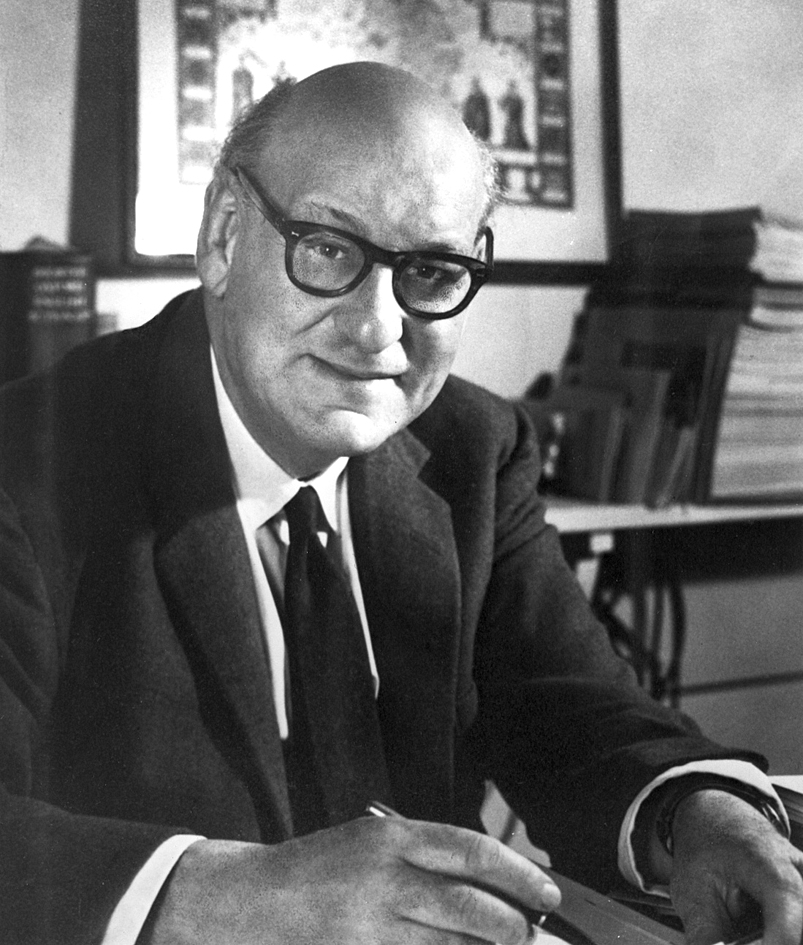
- Hedley Marston
- Born: Hedley Ralph Marston; 26 August 1900; Bordertown, South Australia
- Died: 25 August 1965 (aged 64); Toorak Gardens, South Australia
- Education: University of Adelaide
- Awards: Fellow of the Royal Society; Mueller Medal (1958)
- Scientific career
- Fields: biochemistry
- Workplaces: CSIRO

Hedley Ralph Marston FRS FAA (26 August 1900 – 25 August 1965) was an Australian biochemist who worked for the Commonwealth Scientific and Industrial Research Organisation (CSIRO).

== Education ==
Marston was born in Bordertown, South Australia and educated at Unley District High School, Adelaide, where he met Mark Oliphant. He attended the University of Adelaide but did not complete a degree due to failing Mathematics.

== Career ==
Marston was appointed a demonstrator in the university's department of physiology and biochemistry after a chance meeting with Professor Brailsford Robertson in 1922. On 1 March 1928 he joined Robertson's staff in the division of animal nutrition, CSIRO, Adelaide. Marston greatly impressed Robertson, and became the division's acting-chief on Robertson's death in 1930.

Experiments by Marston confirmed Dick Thomas's hypothesis that a cobalt deficiency was the primary cause of coast disease in sheep. He subsequently oversaw the successful introduction of cobalt supplements.

The New Zealand bacteriologist, Sydney Josland, undertook postgraduate training under the direction of Marston at CSIRO in Adelaide in 1935.

In the 1950s, Marston's research into fallout from the British nuclear tests at Maralinga brought Marston into bitter conflict with the government appointed Atomic Weapons Tests Safety Committee. He was vindicated posthumously by the McClelland Royal Commission, which found that significant radiation hazards existed at many of the Maralinga test sites long after the tests.

His project also tracked fallout across the continent by examining the thyroids of sheep and cattle as well as devices that filtered radioactive elements from air. Later the results, which showed dramatic increases of certain radioactive elements after British Nuclear Tests, caused a further, controversial study where the bones of deceased people (especially children) were burnt to ash and then measured for Strontium-90. These tests showed that the tests had increased the concentration of Strontium-90 dramatically. As well as finding this after British tests a notable 50% increase was noticed one year when there were no tests and it was cited as evidence that the previous years hydrogen bomb tests had contaminated the majority of the world.

== Awards and honours ==
Marston was awarded an honorary Doctor of Science degree in 1957 by the Australian National University. He was elected a Fellow of the Royal Society and a Foundation Fellow of the Australian Academy of Science.

In 1958 he was awarded the Mueller Medal by the Australian and New Zealand Association for the Advancement of Science.
