= Ageusia =

Total loss of the sense of taste

- Pronunciation: /əˈɡjuːziə/ ə-GEW-zee-ə
- Specialty: Neurology

Ageusia (from negative prefix a- and Ancient Greek γεῦσις geûsis 'taste') is the loss of taste functions of the tongue, particularly the inability to detect sweetness, sourness, bitterness, saltiness, and umami (meaning 'savory taste'). It is sometimes confused with anosmia – a loss of the sense of smell. True ageusia is relatively rare compared to hypogeusia – a partial loss of taste – and dysgeusia – a distortion or alteration of taste.

Even though ageusia is considered relatively rare it can impact individuals of any age or demographic. There has been an increase in reported cases of ageusia, due to the COVID-19 pandemic making ageusia more commonly diagnosed than before.

== Symptoms ==
The complete loss of taste.

== Causes ==
Ageusia can arise from various factors:

- Issues with the water-soluble molecules responsible for taste, causing oral dryness or damage to taste buds.
- Radiation therapy treatments.
- Facial nerve damage due to surgery.
- Head traumas, traumas to middle ear or jaw.
- Sinusitis, strep throat, salivary gland infections, common cold, influenza, and COVID-19.
- Bell's palsy or dental procedures like a molar extraction and tonsillectomy.
- Epilepsy, tumors, stroke, or multiple sclerosis.
- Diseases that can affect the autonomic nervous system, like diabetes.
- Some medications, including muscle relaxants, chemotherapy medication, anti-fungal, chemical compounds found in anti-depressants, anti-seizure medications, and blood pressure medications.
- Sialadenitis, gingivitis, oral infections, or glossodynia (burning mouth syndrome (BMS)).

Ageusia resulting from a significant head injury is relatively uncommon, affecting only around 1% of individuals with this type of injury.

=== COVID-19 ===
Ageusia can be an indication of a COVID-19 infection. Ageusia and anosmia are among the prominent symptoms commonly associated with COVID-19, with symptoms that could last up to 4 weeks. However, it is noteworthy that ageusia may manifest differently from anosmia, as anosmia primarily affects the olfactory system versus ageusia primarily affecting the gustatory receptors. As a result, emerging research indicates that the various variants of COVID-19 might be associated with differences in the severity of ageusia experienced by patients, as well as the severity of other taste and smell disorders. Implying that certain strains of the virus may have differing impacts on the sensory functions of affected individuals.

Studies investigating the prevalence of taste disorders stemming from the COVID-19 pandemic indicate that a wide range of individuals were impacted, with some experiencing these issues more severely than others:

Patients	%
European Patients	55.2%
North American Patients	61.0%
Asian Patients	27.1%
South American Patients	29.5%
Australian Patients	25.0%

Patients with ageusia observed in 28.0% of patients, hypogeusia in about 33.5%, and dysgeusia in about 41.3% of patients.

In April 2020, 88% of a series of over 400 COVID-19 disease patients in Europe were reported to report gustatory dysfunction (86% reported olfactory dysfunction). Additionally, in South Korea, out of approximately 2,000 recorded cases of individuals with ageusia related infection from COVID-19, only 30% exhibited ageusia.

The duration of ageusia recovery can vary significantly depending on cause of infection. In a COVID-19-related infection, the recovery timeline for ageusia can vary among individuals, influenced by factors such as variants or strains of the virus, individual immune responses, demographic characteristics, and other factors.

== Proposed mechanisms of infection ==
Recent research has hinted at a connection between the distribution of taste cells and ACE2 receptors in ageusia. Higher amounts of the receptors suggests an easy route for a COVID-19 infection with a possible outcome of ageusia.

Ageusia could also possibly occur due to changes in the abundance or lack of saliva that can eventually cause damage to the cells on the tongue's surface.

=== Saliva and taste perception ===
Saliva is essential in taste sensation and perception. Studies have indicated that saliva plays a critical role in detecting a COVID-19 infection, and ageusia can serve as an indication of an infection that is affecting the salivary glands.

However, there is still insufficient research to fully clarify the full effects of ageusia, COVID-19, and their potential impacts on saliva and 'salivary flow rate.'

=== Zinc deficiency ===
In cases of zinc deficiency, a shortage of zinc-binding proteins that help with the growth and development of taste buds, could result in taste bud issues associated with ageusia, hypogeusia, and hyposalivation.

Low levels of cyclic adenosine monophosphate (cAMP) and cyclic guanosine monophosphate (cGMP), which help with the growth of taste buds, in saliva have also been linked to ageusia.

== Diagnosis ==
Ageusia is usually diagnosed by an otolaryngologist, also known as an ear, nose, and throat doctor (ENT). These individuals can evaluate a patient's loss of taste among other things. To do this, a specialist will look into any other factors that could be causing ageusia, such as examining the head, nose, ears, and mouth. As well as imaging of the head and neck, to help further identify or eliminate the presence of tumors, focal lesions, or any type of injury that could possibly be affecting any taste-related networks. An otolaryngologist can also conduct a series of tests to assess the severity of ageusia, which includes identifying specific tastes that the patient can sense or recognize.

An example of a test used by researchers and doctors is electrogustometry. This test involves applying mild electric currents to specific tongue areas, to assess taste sensitivity in patients exhibiting ageusia and its symptoms.

Another test that can be used to detect the severity of an individuals ageusia is an 'suprathreshold taste test,' also known as a edible strip taste test. The edible strip is placed on the individuals tongue and it contains various flavors for the patient to be able to detect, or not able to detect.

== Treatment ==
Treatment for ageusia varies depending on its cause, whether it stems from certain illnesses, medications, traumatic injuries or other causes.

If ageusia is triggered by a medication prescribed to a patient, discontinuing the medication under the guidance of a healthcare professional may alleviate the symptoms. Switching to an alternative medication can also help resolve the issue. In cases where ageusia is associated with an underlying illness or trauma, some medications can also help alleviate symptoms. Some of these medications include, antihistamines, decongestants, and antibiotics.

=== Complications ===
People experiencing ageusia can endure daily discomfort, which frequently diminishes their enjoyment of eating. This discomfort can cause many individuals affected by taste disorders with feelings of:

- Isolation in individuals experiences
- Feelings of depression
- Social withdrawal
- Unhealthy eating habits

Such eating habits may involve either insufficient food intake or excessive consumption of sour or sweet foods. This dietary pattern could pose risks, particularly for individuals with diabetes.

=== Ageusia and Diabetes ===
Diabetes has been shown to sometimes lead to ageusia, often starting with fluctuations in glucose levels. When blood sugar levels fluctuate, it can disrupt the taste buds, making it difficult to detect flavors. But not everyone with diabetes will experience this. The severity of an individuals ageusia or other taste dysfunction can differ from person to person.
