= Richard Grenfell Thomas =

Australian mineralogist and biochemist

- Born: 29 March 1901; Kapunda, South Australia
- Died: 16 May 1974 (aged 73)
- Other names: Dick Thomas, R. G. Thomas
- Education: University of Adelaide (B.Sc.)
- Known for: Identification of cause of coast disease Naming and description of petrichor
- Scientific career
- Fields: Mineralogy; Biochemistry
- Workplaces: University of Adelaide; CSIRO
- Academic advisors: Douglas Mawson; Brailsford Robertson

Richard Grenfell Thomas (29 March 1901 – 16 May 1974) was an Australian mineralogist and biochemist. He was a senior research scientist in the Commonwealth Scientific and Industrial Research Organisation (CSIRO), ending his career as chief of the Division of Mineral Chemistry. In 1964 he and Isabel Bear scientifically described the smell of rain, for which he coined the term "petrichor".

== Early life ==
Thomas was born on 29 March 1901 in Kapunda, South Australia. He was the son of a pastoralist. As a child he became interested in minerals after exploring abandoned copper mines near his home. In later life he recalled one of his earliest experiments as placing pieces of atacamite into a fire to obtain a blue-green flame.

In 1919, aged 18, Thomas participated in Herbert Basedow's medical expedition to outback South Australia and adjoining portions of Queensland. His main task was to look after the expedition's horses, while Basedow assessed the health of the local Aboriginal people. The expedition was away for four months and several horses died of thirst; Thomas later recalled "we were fortunate that we escaped a similar fate".

Thomas attended the University of Adelaide where he developed a friendship with Mark Oliphant, later a prominent nuclear physicist. He graduated in 1924 with a thesis titled "A Remarkable Occurrence of Monazite", for which he was awarded the Tate Memorial Medal for "the best original work in Australasian geology embodied in a thesis". He subsequently did postgraduate work in mineralogy under Antarctic explorer Sir Douglas Mawson.

== Early career and animal nutrition work ==
After leaving university, Thomas spent three years as a chemist with the Australian Radium Corporation. He devised new methods to recover uranium, radium, vanadium and scandium from the radioactive ores found at Radium Hill. In 1928, he returned to the University of Adelaide to work under Thorburn Brailsford Robertson in the biochemistry department. Robertson's department subsequently became the Division of Animal Nutrition within the Council for Scientific and Industrial Research (CSIR).

Thomas played a key role in identifying the cause of coast disease, a degenerative illness affecting sheep in coastal South Australia and Western Australia. While mapping the spread of the disease on Kangaroo Island, he realised that it was largely confined to areas with calcareous soils, lacking certain heavy metals that were known to be essential animal nutrients. By referring to earlier German experiments with rats, he correctly hypothesised that a cobalt deficiency was the primary cause of the disease, which was later confirmed experimentally by the division's head Hedley Marston.

== Mineral chemistry ==
In 1939, Thomas became aware that the CSIR was planning to set up a Division of Industrial Chemistry. He subsequently wrote a 20-page letter to the new section head, Ian Wark, "listing a dozen or more areas where there was pressing need for investigations; some of immediate interest in connection with the war, and others of long term interest for development of Australian industry".

Wark invited him to move to Melbourne and set up the Minerals Utilization Section within the new division. He was given the rank of senior inorganic chemist, with responsibility for non-metallic minerals and ceramics. In June 1959, the section was given divisional status as the Division of Mineral Chemistry. Thomas served as the new division's chief until his retirement in March 1961. Wark later said of him that "this one man's initiative has led to interesting and valuable work for two hundred people, all of whom have, of course, helped to build on the foundations of Thomas".

One of the projects Thomas initiated was an examination of the smell of rain, which was then termed "argillaceous odour" and associated by mineralogists with argillaceous minerals. After his retirement from the CSIRO he continued to collaborate on the subject with experimental officer Isabel Bear. In March 1964 they published an article titled "Nature of Argillaceous Odour" in the journal Nature, which scientifically described the phenomenon. Thomas coined the term "petrichor" to refer to it, from the Greek "petra" (stone) and "ichor" (essence). Their experiments involved inducing the odour by steam distilling rocks that had been previously exposed to warm, dry conditions. The paper identified that the odour derived from a "yellowish oil" that was released from rocks and soils when their pores were infiltrated by moisture.

== Death and memorials ==
Thomas died in 1974. His ashes were scattered over Mount Painter in the Flinders Ranges, and a memorial plaque was erected by his friend Reg Sprigg, founder of the nearby Arkaroola Wilderness Sanctuary. In 1975, Ian Wark formally opened the R. G. Thomas Lecture Room at the CSIRO's facilities in Melbourne.

== Sources ==
- Bear, Isabel; Biegler, Tom; Scott, T. R. (2001). Alumina to Zirconia: The History of the CSIRO Division of Mineral Chemistry. CSIRO Publishing. ISBN 0643066780.
