= Carbonic anhydrase 6 =

Enzyme found in humans

CA6

Identifiers
- Aliases: CA6, CA-VI, GUSTIN, carbonic anhydrase 6
- External IDs: OMIM: 114780; MGI: 1333786; GeneCards: CA6
Available structures
PDB	Ortholog search: PDBe RCSB
PDB	List of PDB id codes 3FE4
Enzyme activity
EC #	BRENDA	ExPASy	KEGG	MetaCyc
4.2.1.1	↗	↗	↗	↗

Gene location (Human)
Chr.	Chromosome 1 (human)
Band	1p36.23	Start	8,945,867 bp
Band	1p36.23	End	8,975,092 bp

Gene location (Mouse)
Chr.	Chromosome 4 (mouse)
Band	4|4 E2	Start	150,271,472 bp
Band	4|4 E2	End	150,285,789 bp
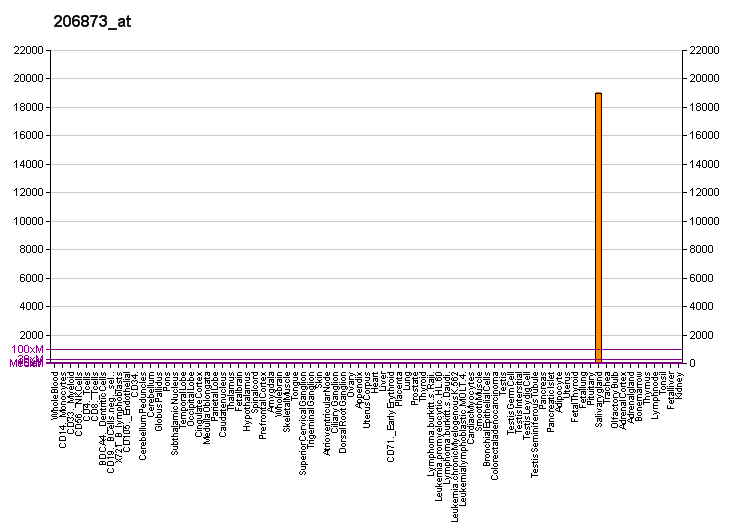
RNA expression pattern
Bgee	Human / Mouse (ortholog); Top expressed in: parotid gland; skin of arm; skin of thigh; skin of hip; skin of abdomen; gonad; vulva; tail of epididymis; hair follicle; tongue / Top expressed in: submandibular gland; parotid gland; lacrimal gland; lip; skin of external ear; temporal muscle; respiratory epithelium; olfactory epithelium; masseter muscle; iris; More reference expression data
BioGPS	More reference expression data
Gene ontology
Molecular function	carbonate dehydratase activity; zinc ion binding; metal ion binding; lyase activity; protein binding; carbonic anhydrase
Cellular component	cytoplasm; extracellular region; cytosol; extracellular exosome; extracellular space
Biological process	bicarbonate transport; detection of chemical stimulus involved in sensory perception of bitter taste; one-carbon metabolic process
Sources:Amigo / QuickGO
Orthologs
Databases	NCBI: entry; OMA: entry
Species	Human	Mouse
Entrez	765	12353
Ensembl	ENSG00000131686	ENSMUSG00000028972
UniProt	P23280; Q8N4G4	P18761
RefSeq (mRNA)	NM_001215; NM_001270500; NM_001270501; NM_001270502	NM_009802
RefSeq (protein)	NP_001206; NP_001257429; NP_001257430; NP_001257431	NP_033932
Location (UCSC)	Chr 1: 8.95 – 8.98 Mb	Chr 4: 150.27 – 150.29 Mb
PubMed search
- Wikidata
View/Edit Human	View/Edit Mouse

Carbonic anhydrase 6, also called gustin, is an enzyme that in humans is encoded by the CA6 gene. Early 1970s studies discovered a protein they called "gustin" because of its presence in saliva, and lower-than-normal levels of salivary zinc in individuals with hypogeusia, and this protein was later identified as CA6 in 1998.

== Function ==
The protein encoded by this gene is one of several isozymes of carbonic anhydrase. This protein is abundantly found in salivary glands and saliva and protein may play a role in the reversible hydratation of carbon dioxide, though its function in saliva is unknown.

It has been suggested that CA VI participates in the maintenance of appropriate pH homeostasis on tooth surfaces as well as in the mucosa of the gastrointestinal canal.
