= Taste detection threshold =

Minimum concentration of a flavoured substance detectable by the sense of taste

Taste detection threshold is the minimum concentration of a flavoured substance detectable by the sense of taste. Sweetness detection thresholds are usually measured relative to that of sucrose, sourness relative to dilute hydrochloric acid, saltiness relative to table salt (NaCl), and bitterness to quinine. These substances have a reference index of 1. Thresholds for bitter substances can be considerably lower than those for other flavoured substances, this may be due to the importance of ingesting large amounts of energy-rich or salty food while avoiding even small quantities of poisonous substances, which are often bitter.

Variation in sensitivity among individuals plays a role in dietary selection and there is evidence that diet reciprocally affects taste sensitivity. One study found that non-vegetarians had less sensitivity to sweetness while vegetarians had higher sensitivity to caffeine, a bitter substance.

== See also ==
- Odor detection threshold – Lowest concentration of a certain odor compound that is perceivable by the human sense of smell
