= Isabel Joy Bear =

Australian chemist (1927–2021)

Isabel Joy Bear AM
- Born: 4 January 1927; Camperdown, Victoria, Australia
- Died: 8 April 2021 (aged 94); Colac, Victoria, Australia
- Education: Melbourne Technical College; Victoria Institute of Colleges
- Awards: Royal Australian Chemical Institute Leighton Medal (1988)
- Scientific career
- Workplaces: CSIRO; University of Birmingham

Isabel Joy Bear AM (4 January 1927 – 8 April 2021) was an Australian chemist who worked at CSIRO for over forty years. She was the first woman to be awarded the Royal Australian Chemical Institute Leighton Medal. She was inducted into the Victorian Honour Roll of Women in 2005. Bear identified several metastable zirconium sulphate hydrates, and with Dick Thomas was the first to scientifically describe "petrichor", the smell of rain on dry soil.

== Early life and education ==
Bear was born in Camperdown, Victoria. Her parents were Isabel Hilda Bear and Rolfe William Bear. Her father had served in the Australian Defence Force, and bought a dairy farm in Derrinallum after returning from World War I. She attended the Derrinallum and South Caulfield State Schools and Hampton High School, where she was the school prefect. Toward the end of her school career, Bear had become interested in scientific research. In 1944, at only seventeen years old, Bear joined a chemistry laboratory in the first iteration of CSIRO, where she worked as a laboratory assistant. During the evening she attended the Melbourne Technical College (now RMIT University), where she earned diplomas in applied chemistry and applied science. During the six years it took Bear to complete her diplomas the criteria for joining CSIRO as a researcher had changed, and Bear was no longer eligible to join.

== Research and career ==
In the 1950s Bear moved to the United Kingdom, where she worked at the Harwell Science and Innovation Campus. She moved to the University of Birmingham, where she worked as a postdoctoral researcher in the department of metallurgy. Whilst working in Birmingham Bear became interested in solid-state chemistry.

Bear joined the Council for Scientific and Industrial Research (CSIRO) in 1953, where she would go on to work for over forty years. She specialised in mineral chemistry, studying the chemical properties of zirconium, hafnium and sulphides. With Principal Research Scientist Ken McTaggart, Bear studied phototropic effects in white oxides, including titanium oxide. She worked with the Western Mining Co., Ltd., with whom she extracted lithium from Western Australian spodumene. In the 1960s Bear identified several new metastable zirconium sulphate hydrates (a heptahydrate and pentahydrate) and worked to uncover their crystal structures.

In 1964 Bear and her colleague Dick Thomas became the first to scientifically describe the smell of rain, for which Thomas coined the term petrichor. Thomas and Bear, like many researchers before them, noticed that dry clays and soils evolve a characteristic odour when they were breathed upon. She performed a series of experiments; steam distilling rocks that had been exposed to dry conditions. During these investigations Bear noticed that the smell was due to a yellowish oil, which they named "petrichor" – blood of the stone. In 2015 researchers at the Massachusetts Institute of Technology released a high speed video that visualised the aerosols released during rainfall.

In 1967 Bear was promoted to the research staff in the Division of Mineral Chemistry at CSIRO, and was the first and only woman to hold such a position. Bear was eventually awarded a doctoral degree in Applied Science from the Victoria Institute of Colleges in 1978. That year she was promoted to senior principal scientist. She developed powder anodes from galena for using in electrowinning of lead and developed new processes to treat lead sulphate residues.

In 1988 Bear became the first woman to be awarded the Royal Australian Chemical Institute Leighton Memorial Medal. She worked to document the history of the CSIRO Division of Chemical Engineering and Australia's heritage in mineral chemistry in The History of the CSIRO Division of Mineral Chemistry.

Bear retired from the CSIRO in 2015 after a career of more than 70 years.

== Awards and honours ==
- 1974 Elected Fellow of the Australasian Institute of Mining and Metallurgy
- 1986 Elected Fellow of the Royal Australian Chemical Institute
- 1986 Member of the Order of Australia
- 1988 Royal Australian Chemical Institute Leighton Memorial Medal
- 2005 Victorian Honour Roll of Women
