= Dimethyl sulfide =

- Skeletal formula of dimethyl sulfide with all implicit hydrogens shown

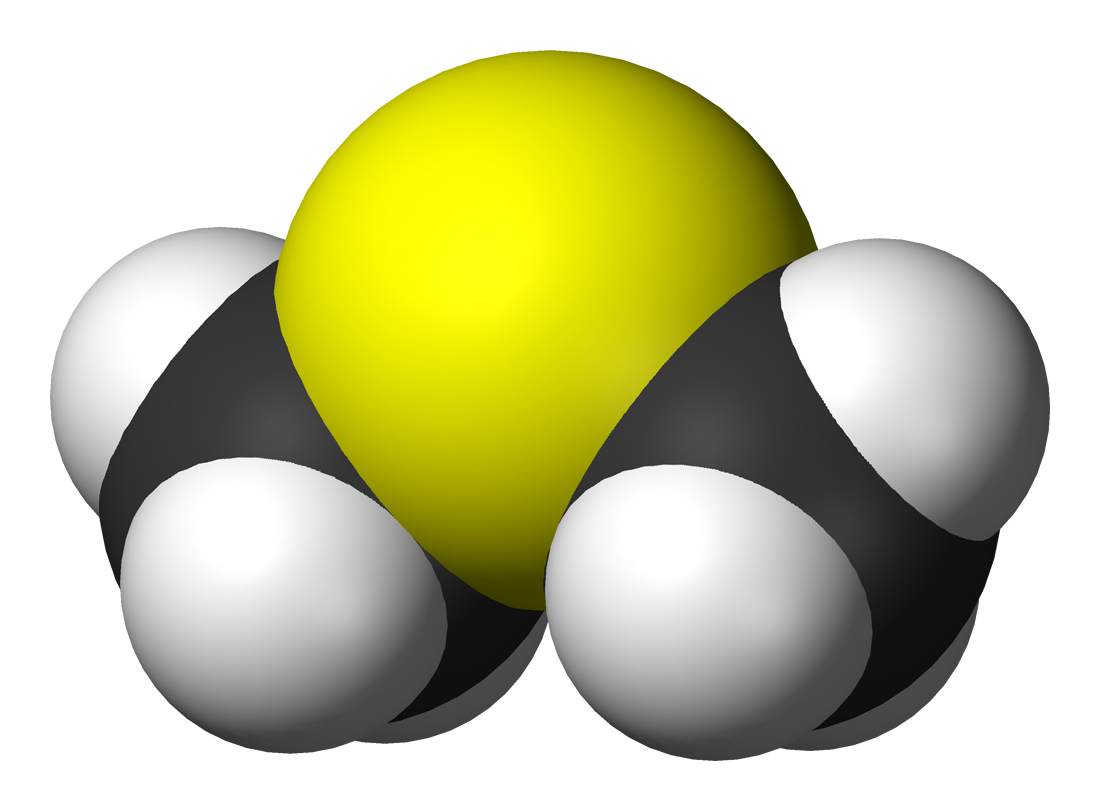
- Spacefill model of dimethyl sulfide Space-filling model

Names
- Preferred IUPAC name (Methylsulfanyl)methane
- Other names: (Methylthio)methane; Dimethyl sulfide; Dimethyl thioether

Identifiers
| CAS Number | 75-18-3 |
| 3D model (JSmol) | Interactive image |
| Abbreviations | DMS; Me_{2}S |
| Beilstein Reference | 1696847 |
| ChEBI | CHEBI:17437 |
| ChEMBL | ChEMBL15580 |
| ChemSpider | 1039 |
| ECHA InfoCard | 100.000.770 |
| EC Number | 200-846-2 |
| KEGG | C00580 |
| MeSH | dimethyl+sulfide |
| PubChem CID | 1068 |
| RTECS number | PV5075000 |
| UNII | QS3J7O7L3U |
| UN number | 1164 |
| CompTox Dashboard (EPA) | DTXSID9026398 |
- InChI: InChI=1S/C2H6S/c1-3-2/h1-2H3 Key: QMMFVYPAHWMCMS-UHFFFAOYSA-N; Key: QMMFVYPAHWMCMS-UHFFFAOYAH
- SMILES: CSC

Properties
| Chemical formula | C_{2}H_{6}S |
| Molar mass | 62.13 g·mol^{−1} |
| Appearance | Colourless liquid |
| Odor | Stench: cabbage, sulfurous, unpleasant |
| Density | 0.846 g/cm^{3} |
| Melting point | −98 °C; −145 °F; 175 K |
| Boiling point | 38 °C (decomposes at 450 °C) |
| Solubility in water | 2 g/L (at 20 °C) |
| log P | 0.977 |
| Vapor pressure | 50.5 kPa (at 20 °C) |
| Magnetic susceptibility (χ) | −44.9×10^{−6} cm^{3}/mol |
| Refractive index (n_{D}) | 1.435 |

Thermochemistry
| Std enthalpy of formation (Δ_{f}H^{⦵}_{298}) | −63.9 to −66.9 kJ⋅mol^{−1} |
| Std enthalpy of combustion (Δ_{c}H^{⦵}_{298}) | −2.1812 to −2.1818 MJ⋅mol^{−1} |

Hazards
- GHS labelling
| Pictograms | (GHS02: Flammable) (GHS05: Corrosive) (GHS07: Exclamation mark) |
| Signal word | Danger |
| Hazard statements | H225, H319 |
| Precautionary statements | P210, P261, P280, P305+P351+P338 |
| NFPA 704 (fire diamond) | 2 3 0 |
| Flash point | −48 °C (−54 °F; 225 K) |
| Autoignition temperature | 205 °C (401 °F; 478 K) |
| Explosive limits | Upper: 19.7% v/v Lower: 2.2% v/v |
- Lethal dose or concentration (LD, LC)
| LD_{50} (median dose) | > 2000 mg/kg (oral, rat) > 5000 mg/kg (dermal, rabbit) |
| LC_{50} (median concentration) | 40250 ppm (rat, 4 h) |
| Safety data sheet (SDS) | Fisher Scientific |

Related compounds
| Related chalcogenides | Dimethyl ether (dimethyl oxide); Dimethyl selenide; Dimethyl telluride |
| Related compounds | Dimethyl sulfoxide; Dimethyl sulfone |
- Except where otherwise noted, data are given for materials in their standard state (at 25 °C [77 °F], 100 kPa). verify (what is ?) Infobox references

Dimethyl sulfide (DMS) or methylthiomethane is an organosulfur compound with the formula (CH_{3})_{2}S. It is the simplest thioether and has a characteristic disagreeable odor. It is a flammable liquid that boils at 37 °C (99 °F). It is a component of the odor produced from cooking of certain vegetables (notably maize, cabbage, and beetroot) and seafoods. It is also an indication of bacterial contamination in brewing. It is a breakdown product of dimethylsulfoniopropionate (DMSP), and is also produced by the bacterial metabolism of methanethiol.

== Occurrence and production ==
DMS originates primarily from DMSP, (dimethylsulfoniopropionate), a major secondary metabolite in some marine algae. DMS is the most abundant biological sulfur compound emitted to the atmosphere. Emission occurs over the oceans by phytoplankton.

DMS is also produced naturally by bacterial transformation of dimethyl sulfoxide (DMSO).

Marine phytoplankton produce dimethyl sulfide, and DMS is also produced by bacterial cleavage of extracellular DMSP. This may be an adaptive trait, as the algae can use the resulting clouds to disperse themselves around the world. DMS has been characterized as the "smell of the sea", though it would be more accurate to say that DMS is a component of the smell of the sea, others being chemical derivatives of DMS, such as oxides, and yet others being algal pheromones such as dictyopterenes.

Dimethyl sulfide, dimethyl disulfide, and dimethyl trisulfide have been found among the volatiles given off by the fly-attracting plant known as dead-horse arum (Helicodiceros muscivorus). Those compounds are components of an odor like rotting meat which attracts various pollinators that feed on carrion such as many species of flies.

=== Brewing ===
DMS can occur in beer as a product from either S-Methylmethionine (SMM) or dimethyl sulfoxide (DMSO). Most SSM and DMSO stem from the malt, formed during the malting process (germination and kilning), and converted to DMS during the brewing process. SMM is converted to DMS when heated, both during kilning and during boiling of the wort. DMSO may form during kilning, from oxidation of DMS. It is heat stable and may remain in the wort into fermentation, where bacteria (or yeast) can reduce it to DMS.

=== Astronomical detection ===
Dimethyl sulfide has been detected in comets, which indicates non-living sources are available. For comet 67P/Churyumov-Gerasimenko, the European Space Agency sampled the cloud of dust and gas shed from the comet.

=== Industrial production ===
In industry dimethyl sulfide is produced by treating hydrogen sulfide with methanol over an aluminium oxide catalyst:

2 CH_{3}OH + H_{2}S → (CH_{3})_{2}S + 2 H_{2}O

Dimethyl sulfide is emitted by kraft pulping mills as a side product from delignification.

== Odor ==
Dimethyl sulfide has a characteristic odor commonly described as cabbage-like. It becomes highly disagreeable at even quite low concentrations. Some reports claim that DMS has a low olfactory threshold that varies from 0.02 to 0.1 ppm between persons, but it has been suggested that the odor attributed to dimethyl sulfide may in fact be due to disulfides, polysulfides and thiol impurities, since the odor of dimethyl sulfide is much less disagreeable after it is freshly washed with saturated aqueous mercuric chloride. Dimethyl sulfide is also available as a food additive to impart a savory flavor; in such use, its concentration is low. Beetroot, asparagus, cabbage, maize and seafoods produce dimethyl sulfide when cooked.

Dimethyl sulfide is also produced by marine planktonic microorganisms such as the coccolithophores. It contributes to the characteristic odor of sea air. In the Victorian era, before DMS was discovered, the origin of sea air's 'bracing' aroma was misattributed to ozone.

Dimethyl sulfide is the main volatile product of various truffles. It is the compound that animals trained to uncover the fungus (such as pigs and detection dogs) sniff out when searching for them.

== Chemical reactions ==
=== Lewis basicity ===
As a Lewis base. It is classified as a soft ligand (see also ECW model). It forms complexes with many transition metals. For example, it serves a displaceable ligand in chloro(dimethyl sulfide)gold(I). It is used is for the production of borane dimethyl sulfide from diborane:

B_{2}H_{6} + 2 (CH_{3})_{2}S → 2 BH_{3}·S(CH_{3})_{2}

=== Other reactions ===
With chlorinating agents such as sulfuryl chloride, dimethyl sulfide converts to chloromethyl methyl sulfide:

SO_{2}Cl_{2} + (CH_{3})_{2}S → SO_{2} + HCl + ClCH_{2}SCH_{3}

Like other methylthio compounds, DMS is deprotonated by butyl lithium:

CH_{3}CH_{2}CH_{2}CH_{2}Li + (CH_{3})_{2}S → CH_{3}CH_{2}CH_{2}CH_{3} + LiCH_{2}SCH_{3}

=== Oxidation and reduction ===
Oxidation of dimethyl sulfide gives the solvent dimethyl sulfoxide. Further oxidation affords dimethyl sulfone. Dimethyl sulfide is used in the workup of the ozonolysis of alkenes, where it reduces the intermediate trioxolane.

The Swern oxidation produces dimethyl sulfide by reduction of dimethylsulfoxide.

DMS is oxidized in the marine atmosphere to various sulfur-containing compounds, such as sulfur dioxide, dimethyl sulfoxide (DMSO), dimethyl sulfone, methanesulfonic acid and sulfuric acid. Among these compounds, sulfuric acid has the potential to create new aerosols which act as cloud condensation nuclei. It usually results in the formation of sulfate particles in the troposphere. Through this interaction with cloud formation, the massive production of atmospheric DMS over the oceans may have a significant impact on the Earth's climate. The CLAW hypothesis suggests that in this manner DMS may play a role in planetary homeostasis.

DMS is oxidized by the atmospheric NO_{3} radical to give atmospheric nitric acid.

== Safety ==
Dimethyl sulfide is highly flammable; its flash point is −38 °C (−36 °F) or −49 °C (−56 °F). Its self-ignition temperature is 205 °C (401 °F). It is an eye and skin irritant and is harmful if swallowed. It has an unpleasant odor at even extremely low concentrations.

Dimethyl sulfide is normally present at very low levels in healthy people, namely less than 7 nM in blood, less than 3 nM in urine and 0.13 to 0.65 nM on expired breath.

At pathologically dangerous concentrations, this is known as dimethylsulfidemia. This condition is associated with blood borne halitosis and dimethylsulfiduria.

== See also ==
- Coccolithophore, a marine unicellular planktonic photosynthetic algae, producer of DMS
- Dimethylsulfoniopropionate, a parent molecule of DMS and methanethiol in the oceans
- Emiliania huxleyi, a coccolithophorid producing DMS
- Gaia hypothesis
- Geosmin, the substance responsible for the odour of earth
- Petrichor, the earthy scent produced when rain falls on dry soil
