= Electrogustometry =

Electrogustometry is the measurement of taste threshold by passing controlled anodal current through the tongue. When current passes through the tongue a unique and distinct metallic taste is perceived.

Electrogustometry has been in existence since the 1950s. However, not much research has been done in this field.

== Equipment ==
TR Bull developed an electrogustometer, but it lacked precision and was not widely accepted. In the 1990s the Rion (TR-06) was developed. This was precise and is widely used in the market. The TR-06 is probably the only electrogustometer used now for research and diagnosis. This is manual and needs a trained doctor or nurse to use it. It needs to be manually calculated to arrive at the taste threshold and carry out the false positive tests.

Small, light and portable, this hand-held, battery-powered device can be easily placed in any environment. It has an inbuilt false detection test. This is useful for the psychophysical analysis of the subject.

== Influencing factors ==
Electrogustometric taste threshold depends on pulse duration pulse and area of contact of electrode and tongue. Detailed experiments will be performed to prove and discuss their influence on taste threshold with the automatic electrogustometer. Experiments have been performed with the manual TR-06 on to study the effects of these control factors.

== Philosophy ==
The measure of the minimum amount of current required to excite the sensation of this taste is called the 'taste threshold'. This project involves the design and fabrication of an automatic instrument to measure this taste threshold.

== See also ==
- Machine olfaction
- Olfactometer
