= 2-Methylisoborneol =

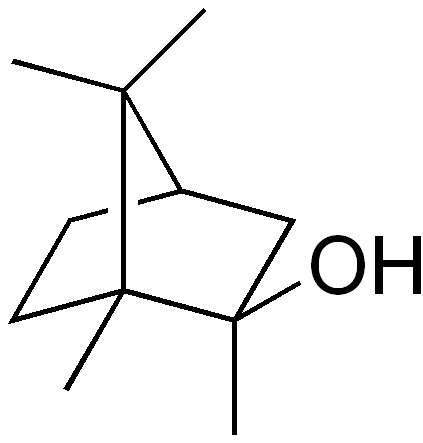

Names
- IUPAC name 1,2,7,7-tetramethylbicyclo[2.2.1]heptan-2-ol
- Other names 2-Methyl-2-bornanol

Identifiers
CAS Number	2371-42-8
3D model (JSmol)	Interactive image; Interactive image
Abbreviations	MIB
ChEBI	CHEBI:61987
ChemSpider	16024
KEGG	C20243
PubChem CID	16913
UNII	D43XMP4DNW
CompTox Dashboard (EPA)	DTXSID90940148
- InChI: InChI=1S/C11H20O/c1-9(2)8-5-6-10(9,3)11(4,12)7-8/h8,12H,5-7H2,1-4H3 Key: LFYXNXGVLGKVCJ-UHFFFAOYSA-N; InChI=1/C11H20O/c1-9(2)8-5-6-10(9,3)11(4,12)7-8/h8,12H,5-7H2,1-4H3 Key: LFYXNXGVLGKVCJ-UHFFFAOYAW
- SMILES: CC1(C2CCC1(C(C2)(C)O)C)C; OC2(C)CC1CCC2(C1(C)C)C

Properties
Chemical formula	C_{11}H_{20}O
Molar mass	168.28 g/mol
- Except where otherwise noted, data are given for materials in their standard state (at 25 °C [77 °F], 100 kPa). verify (what is ?) Infobox references

2-Methylisoborneol (MIB) is an irregular monoterpene derived from the universal monoterpene precursor geranyl pyrophosphate. MIB and the irregular sesquiterpene geosmin together account for the majority of biologically caused taste and odor outbreaks in drinking water worldwide. MIB has a distinct earthy or musty odor, which most people can easily smell. The odor detection threshold of MIB is very low, ranging from 0.002 to 0.02 micrograms per liter in water. MIB is also a factor in cork taint in winemaking.

MIB is produced by various blue-green algae (cyanobacteria) and filamentous bacteria in the class Actinomycetia, and also some other prokaryotes and eukaryotes. The main genera in the cyanobacteria that have been shown to produce MIB include Oscillatoria, Phormidium, and Planktothrix, while the main genus in the Actinomycetia that produces MIB is Streptomyces. They give a musty or earthy odor that can be quite strong if an algal bloom is present. Subsequent death of the microorganisms will release MIB that is trapped in the cells. Along with geosmin, the off flavors that result are issues in the seafood industry. This chemical is the major cause of "muddy" or "dirt" flavors in catfish and crawfish.

Rhodococcus and Comamonas bacteria can degrade 2-methylisoborneol.
