= Odor detection threshold =

Lowest perceivable odor concentration

The odor detection threshold is the lowest concentration of a certain odor compound that is perceivable by the human sense of smell. The threshold of a chemical compound is determined in part by its shape, polarity, partial charges, and molecular mass. The olfactory mechanisms responsible for a compound's different detection threshold is not well understood. Although it is traditionally measured through sensory tests with human participants, recent machine-learning approaches have shown predictive potential for aqueous odor detection thresholds.

Optical isomers can have different detection thresholds because their conformations may cause them to be less perceivable for the human nose. It is only in recent years that such compounds were separated on gas chromatographs.

For raw water treatment and waste water management, the term commonly used is Threshold Odor Number (TON). For instance, the water to be supplied for domestic use in Illinois is 3 TON.

== Values ==
- The threshold value is the concentration at which an aroma or taste can be detected (air, water and fat).
- The recognition threshold or arousal threshold of olfactory neurons is the concentration at which an odor can be identified (air, water and fat).
- The odour activity value is the concentration divided by the threshold.
- The flavor impact is the value the rate of change in perception with concentration.
- The flavor contribution of an aroma component in a mixture to the total profile can be calculated from the total odor units and the number contributed by that aroma chemical.

=== Odor detection value ===
Odor threshold value (OTV) (also aroma threshold value (ATV), Flavor threshold) is defined as the most minimal concentration of a substance that can be detected by a human nose. Some substances can be detected when their concentration is only few milligrams per 1000 tonnes, which is less than a drop in an Olympic swimming pool. Odor threshold value can be expressed as a concentration in water or concentration in air.

Two major types of flavor thresholds can be distinguished: the absolute and the difference threshold. The odor detection threshold and the odor recognition threshold are absolute thresholds; the first is the minimum concentration at which an odor can be detected without any requirements to identify or recognize the stimulus, while the second is the minimum concentration at which a stimulus can be identified or recognized.

The odor threshold value of an odorant is influenced by the medium.

Examples of substances with strong odors:

- Maple furanone (OTV = 1 ppq)
- Grapefruit mercaptan (OTV = 0.1 ppt)
- Sotolon (OTV = 1 ppt)
- (Z)-8-tetradecenal (OTV = 9 ppt in water)
- Geosmin (OTV = 10 ppt)
- strawberry furanone (OTV = 40 ppt)
- Trimethylamine (OTV = 0.37 - 1.06 ppb)
- p-vinylguaiacol (OTV = 10 ppb)

== Variables ==
Threshold in a food is dependent upon:

- The threshold of the aroma in air.
- Concentration in the food.
- Solubility in oil and water.
- Partition coefficient between the air and the food.
- The pH of the food. Some aroma compounds are affected by the pH: weak organic acids are protonated at low pH making them less soluble and hence more volatile.
- Number and functionality of odorant receptors in the observer's nose.

The concentration of an odor above a food is dependent on its solubility in that food and its vapor pressure and concentration in that food.

== Variation by individual ==
A 2014 study found no significant differences between men and women, and between non-pregnant and pregnant individuals, despite the existence of anecdotal reports of hyperosmia among the latter.

People with multiple sclerosis (MS) have been found to have higher olfactory thresholds. In scientific research, this is often represented by a lower threshold score, i.e. reversing the scale. Olfactory function is more impaired in patients with primary progressive MS than in relapsing-remitting MS.

== Variation among species ==
Some species can detect odors that others cannot. It is widely believed that animals such as dogs and rodents have a superior sense of smell overall, however a 2017 paper disputed that, saying that "the absolute number of olfactory neurons is remarkably consistent across mammals".

== See also ==
- Dimethyl sulfide – One of the molecules responsible for the odour of the sea
- Geosmin – Chemical compound responsible for the characteristic odour of earth
- Olfactometer – Instrument used to detect and measure odor dilution
- Taste detection threshold – Minimum concentration of a flavoured substance detectable by the sense of taste
