= Pentalenene synthase =

pentalenene synthase

Identifiers
- EC no.: 4.2.3.7
- CAS no.: 90597-46-9

Databases
- IntEnz: IntEnz view
- BRENDA: BRENDA entry
- ExPASy: NiceZyme view
- KEGG: KEGG entry
- MetaCyc: metabolic pathway
- PRIAM: profile
- PDB structures: RCSB PDB PDBe PDBsum
- Gene Ontology: AmiGO / QuickGO
Search
- PMC: articles
- PubMed: articles
- NCBI: proteins

The enzyme pentalenene synthase (EC 4.2.3.7) catalyzes the chemical reaction

(2E,6E)-farnesyl diphosphate $\rightleftharpoons$ pentalenene + diphosphate

This enzyme belongs to the family of lyases, specifically those carbon-oxygen lyases acting on phosphates. The systematic name of this enzyme class is (2E,6E)-farnesyl-diphosphate diphosphate-lyase (cyclizing, pentalenene-forming). This enzyme is also called pentalenene synthetase. The crystal structure of pentalenene synthase was the first of a bacterial terpene cyclase and was reported by the research group of David W. Christianson at the University of Pennsylvania.
