= Scent of Rain =

Play written by Mark Dunn

Poster of play Scent of Rain

Scent of Rain subtitled Scent of Rain: A Love Story Really! is a gay-themed comedy play written by Mark Dunn, produced by Blue Suit Productions. The play starring Ryan Idol was also made available on DVD. It had a run from 1999 (Opening date the 1 of August) to 2003 at the Bailiwick Repertory Theatre in Chicago and Tiffany Theater in Los Angeles.

Scent of Rain is set in rural America. Danne Taylor plays the role of a dying father of an all-male family wants to know that his sons are happily married before he passes on. The two older straight boys are engaged to twin sisters. However, their younger brother Jonathan (played by Nicholas Conlon) is "special", and his father is concerned that he will go through life alone, unless they can find him a husband, with assistance and support from a "hired hand" named Bill Tom (Idol) to arrange this. Attempts include a match with an escaped convict and later, a good-hearted drag queen. But as it turns out, Jonathan has felt a lifelong affection for Bill Tom himself.

Some compared the story to a gay version of Seven Brides for Seven Brothers reduced into "one husband for one brother".

== Reception ==
The play received critical acclaim with the Chicago Tribune saying the play was an unabashed wish fulfillment fantasy and pick of the week, and Los Angeles Times added that it has genuine humor and genuine poetry and will bring a smile and a nice warm feeling to even the most jaded theatergoers. LA Weekly said this was fresh and original, and a wicked take on contemporary gay theatre.
