= Odour activity value =

Scientific measure related to flavors

Odour activity value (OAV) is a measure of importance of a specific compound to the odour of a sample (e.g. food). It is calculated as the ratio between the concentration of individual substance in a sample and the threshold concentration of this substance (odour threshold value, the minimal concentration that can be detected by human nose).
