= Olfactometer =

Instrument used to detect and measure odor dilution

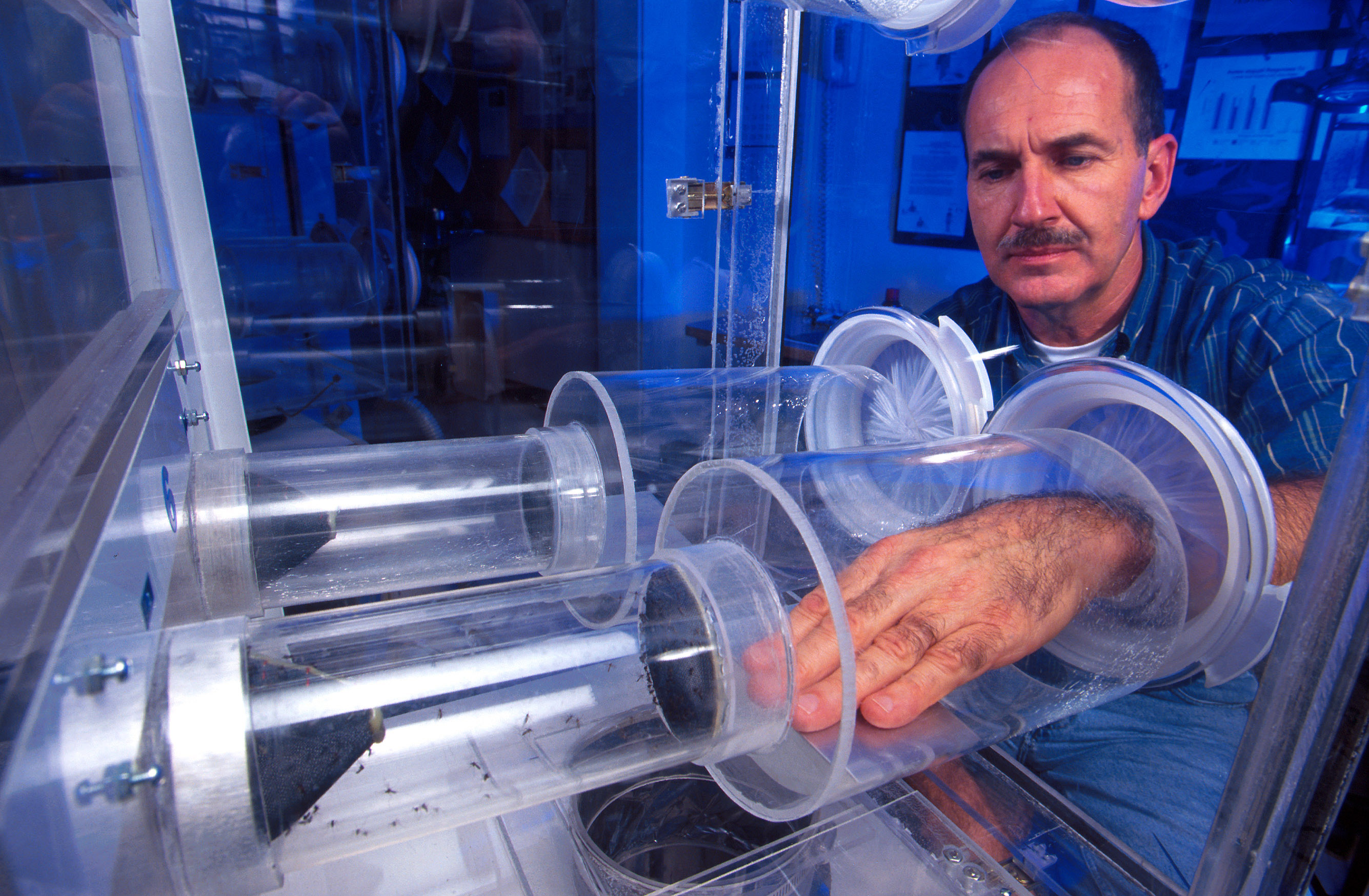
An entomologist demonstrates the attraction of female yellow fever mosquitoes to his hand in an olfactometer

An olfactometer is an instrument used to detect and measure odor dilution. Olfactometers are used in conjunction with human subjects in laboratory settings, most often in market research, to quantify and qualify human olfaction. Olfactometers are used to gauge the odor detection threshold of substances. To measure intensity, olfactometers introduce an odorous gas as a baseline against which other odors are compared.

Many scientists use the term "olfactometer" to refer to a device used to study insect behavior in presence of an olfactory stimulus. It consists of a tube with a bifurcation (with "T" or "Y" shape) where an insect walks and decides between two choices, usually clean air versus air carrying an odor. This is why this device is also called dual choice olfactometer.

Alternatively, an olfactometer is a device used for producing aromas in a precise and controlled manner.

== Flow-olfactometer ==
=== Description ===
According to Lindstrom et al, continuous flow olfactometers enable very fast onset and offset timing, thereby creating a nice, square-shaped stimulus presentation. In these designs, air flows continuously through or over the odor source and is then transported via tubing to the subject. Vacuum pressure plays an important role in a continuous flow olfactometer, where it is utilized both to switch between odorized air flow and control flow and to evacuate odors, often just below the subject’s nose.

=== How a flow-olfactometer works ===
A flow-olfactometer produces a constant heated and humidified flow of pure air. This air flow runs continuously to the subjects nose. For the length of the stimulus pulse the continuous air flow is replaced by a block of odorized air.

== Dynamic dilution olfactometer ==
The new generations of dynamic dilution olfactometers quantify odors using a panel and can allow different complementary techniques: odor concentration and odor threshold determination, odor suprathreshold determination with comparison to a reference gas, hedonic scale assessment to determine the degree of appreciation, evaluation of the relative intensity of odors, and allow training and automatic evaluation of expert panels.

The most recognised olfactometry standard is currently the EN13725 standard. Analyses performed by olfactometers are often used in site diagnostics (multiple odor sources) performed with the goal of establishing odor management plans.

== Field olfactometry ==
Field olfactometry can be a useful tool in validating odor complaints, or determining odor levels for various locations. Field olfactometers provide the same basic function of a laboratory olfactometer but are designed to be used by a single panelist to measure ambient odors. To be classified as a field olfactometer the device must be able to provide accurate and controlled dilution of the ambient air with odorless air and present the diluted sample to the panelist at controlled and positive air flow.

The Nasal Ranger, developed by St. Croix Sensory, is a common brand of field olfactometer used in wastewater treatment plants, industrial facilities, and marijuana grow houses.

== Verifying odorant level in natural gas ==
Natural gas odorant concentrations are required to be readily detectable at one-fifth of the lower flammable limit of the gas by state and federal regulation. Many gas companies utilize olfactometers to verify this standard. The ASTM has published a standard test method for this determination.

== See also ==
- Electronic nose
- Electrogustometry
- Machine olfaction
