= Petrichor =

Earthy smell when rain falls on dry soil

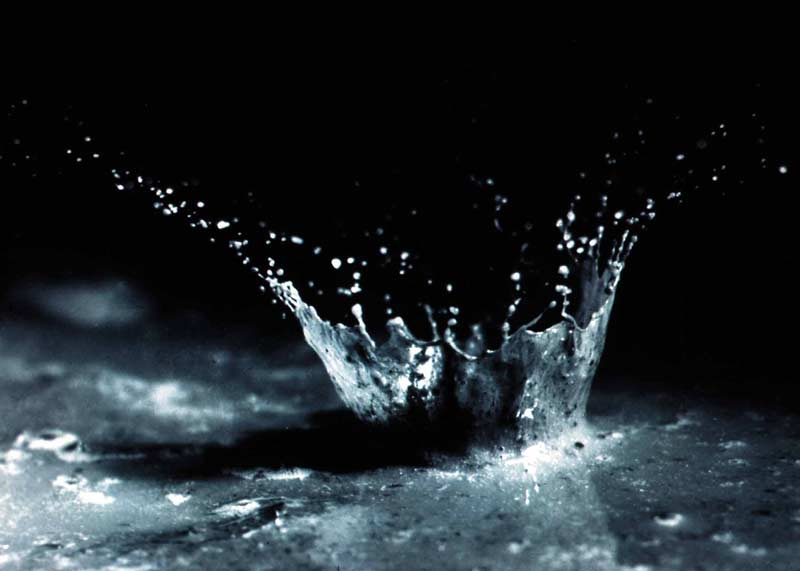
Soil and water being splashed by a raindrop

Petrichor (/ˈpɛtrɪkɔːr/ PET-rik-or) is the earthy scent often associated with rain falling on dry soil or rock. The term was introduced by Australian researchers Isabel Joy Bear and Richard Grenfell Thomas in a 1964 paper in Nature. Bear and Thomas used the term for an odour released from rock or soil materials after dry conditions when they are exposed to moisture.

The smell is associated with oils that accumulate in rocks and soil during dry periods and are released by moisture, as well as volatile compounds produced by soil microorganisms, particularly geosmin and 2-methylisoborneol. Later experiments using high-speed cameras found that raindrops striking porous surfaces can trap air bubbles, which rise and burst as aerosols, providing a possible mechanism by which scent-carrying material can enter the air.

The noun petrichor originated as a compound of two Greek words, πέτρα (meaning 'rock' or 'stone') and ἰχώρ ('ichor', the ethereal golden fluid that runs in the veins of Ancient Greek gods and goddesses).

== History ==
Descriptions of the distinctive smell of earth after rain predate its modern scientific name. Ancient Greek natural-philosophical writings, including the pseudo-Aristotelian Problems and writings of Theophrastus, discussed fragrances arising from the ground or vegetation after rain, sometimes in association with rainbows. The Roman naturalist Pliny the Elder described a similar phenomenon in Natural History, observing that earth emits a particularly pleasant odour when rain follows prolonged drought. Pliny regarded this scent as a characteristic of fertile soil. Classical scholarship has identified these descriptions with the phenomenon now known as petrichor.

Early scientific investigations of the phenomenon appeared during the nineteenth century. In 1891, French chemists Marcellin Berthelot and G. André reported their investigations of the characteristic odour of soil in a paper entitled "Sur l'odeur propre de la terre" ("On the Earth's Own Smell"), published in Comptes rendus de l'Académie des Sciences. They extracted an odorous substance from soil by steam distillation but were unable to establish its chemical identity.

An early primary report on the phenomenon by Thomas Lambe Phipson (1833–1908) appeared in The Chemical News on 17 April 1891, which was republished the following month in Scientific American. Referring to the work of Berthelot and André, Phipson stated that he had investigated the subject as early as 1865, although he was uncertain whether his observations had been published. He proposed that the odour arose from organic substances related to the essential oils of plants, absorbed into the pores of soil during dry weather and subsequently released by rain. His attempts to identify the odorous material led him to suggest a resemblance to compounds derived from cedar oil. These investigations preceded the identification of the microbial compounds subsequently associated with earthy soil odours.

During the early twentieth century, investigations of earthy odours increasingly considered the contribution of soil microorganisms, particularly the actinomycetes. Studies of these bacteria helped establish a connection between the characteristic smell of soil and members of the genus Streptomyces, although the specific chemical compounds responsible had not yet been identified. Research into similar earthy and musty odours in water supplies also contributed to the investigation of microbial sources of these substances.

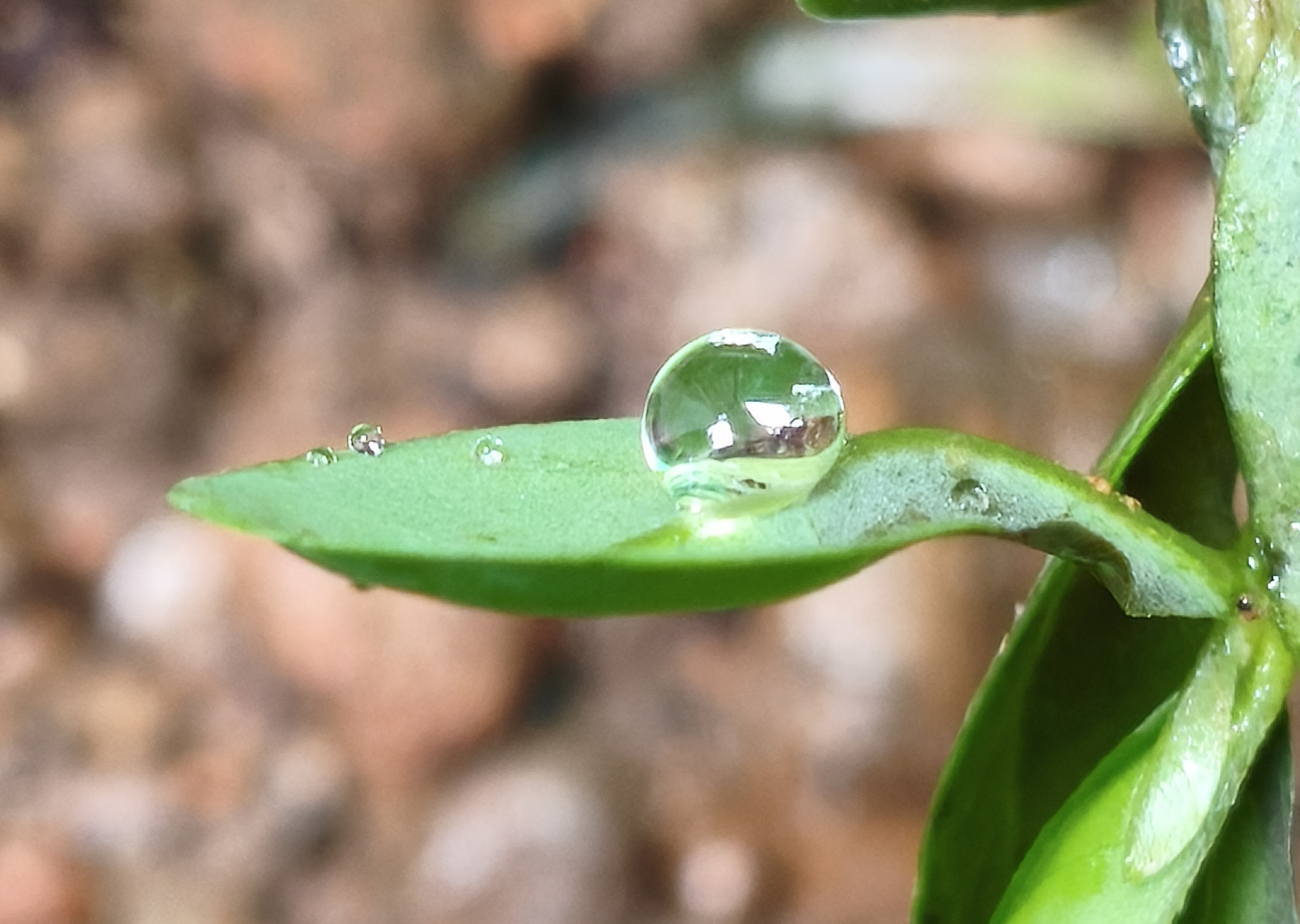
Water drop on the leaf of a flowering plant after rain

The phenomenon was further scientifically described in a March 1964 paper by Australian researchers Isabel Bear and Dick Thomas, published in the journal Nature. Thomas coined the term "petrichor" to refer to what had previously been known as "argillaceous odour". The researchers investigated the characteristic smell produced when dry clays, rocks and other mineral materials were moistened. By distilling rocks exposed to warm, dry conditions, they obtained an odorous oil and demonstrated that moisture could release the accumulated material. Their work associated the scent with organic compounds retained by mineral surfaces rather than with a single fixed chemical substance.

In a follow-up paper, Bear and Thomas suggested in 1965 that the chemical components giving rise to the "argillaceous odour of petrichor" also slow seed germination and early plant growth. Their experiments found that small quantities of oily extracts from mineral materials delayed the germination and development of several types of seeds. In a more detailed investigation published in 1966, the researchers examined several possible mechanisms for petrichor formation. They proposed that organic compounds, including lipids, terpenes and decomposition products of plant and animal matter, are absorbed onto rocks and clays under dry conditions, undergo chemical transformations, and are subsequently released when moisture enters the pores of the material.

A related development in 1965 was the isolation of geosmin, an earthy-smelling compound produced by certain microorganisms, by American microbiologists Nancy N. Gerber and Hubert A. Lechevalier. They obtained the substance from cultures of actinomycetes, including Streptomyces griseus, and named it from the Greek words for earth and smell. Gerber subsequently established the chemical structure of geosmin in 1968. These discoveries distinguished a specific microbial odorant from the broader mixture of substances associated with petrichor.

Research during the following decades investigated the biological origins, chemical structures and synthesis of geosmin and related earthy-smelling compounds, particularly 2-methylisoborneol. The compounds also became important in studies of undesirable tastes and odours in drinking water, fish and other food products. During the 2000s, biochemical and genetic investigations identified enzymes and genes responsible for geosmin production in Streptomyces, helping to explain how soil microorganisms synthesize the compound.

Research in 2015 suggested a physical mechanism by which scent-bearing substances may be dispersed into the air. Using high-speed photography, researchers at the Massachusetts Institute of Technology observed that raindrops impacting porous surfaces generate aerosols as trapped air bubbles rise and burst. The researchers proposed that this process may contribute to the release of petrichor and found that light and moderate rainfall could produce more aerosols than heavier rainfall under the conditions investigated.

Research in the 2020s has further examined the ecological functions of bacterial compounds associated with earthy soil odours. A 2020 study found that the terpenoids geosmin and 2-methylisoborneol, produced by sporulating Streptomyces bacteria, attract springtails (Collembola), which can disperse bacterial spores after feeding on the colonies. Subsequent scientific commentary and reviews have discussed these findings as evidence that microbial odours can function as chemical signals mediating interactions between soil organisms. A 2023 review of geosmin research summarized its biosynthesis, distribution among microorganisms and possible ecological roles, while noting that its precise biological functions remain incompletely understood.

More recent investigations have also examined the atmospheric chemistry of compounds emitted when dry soils become wet. A 2026 study of dryland soils along an aridity gradient extending into Israel's Negev Desert identified 58 volatile organic compounds associated with soil rewetting and reported rapid increases in their emissions. The researchers suggested that these emissions may contribute to atmospheric ozone and secondary aerosol formation, extending the investigation of petrichor beyond its characteristic smell to its possible effects on atmospheric chemistry.

== Mechanism ==
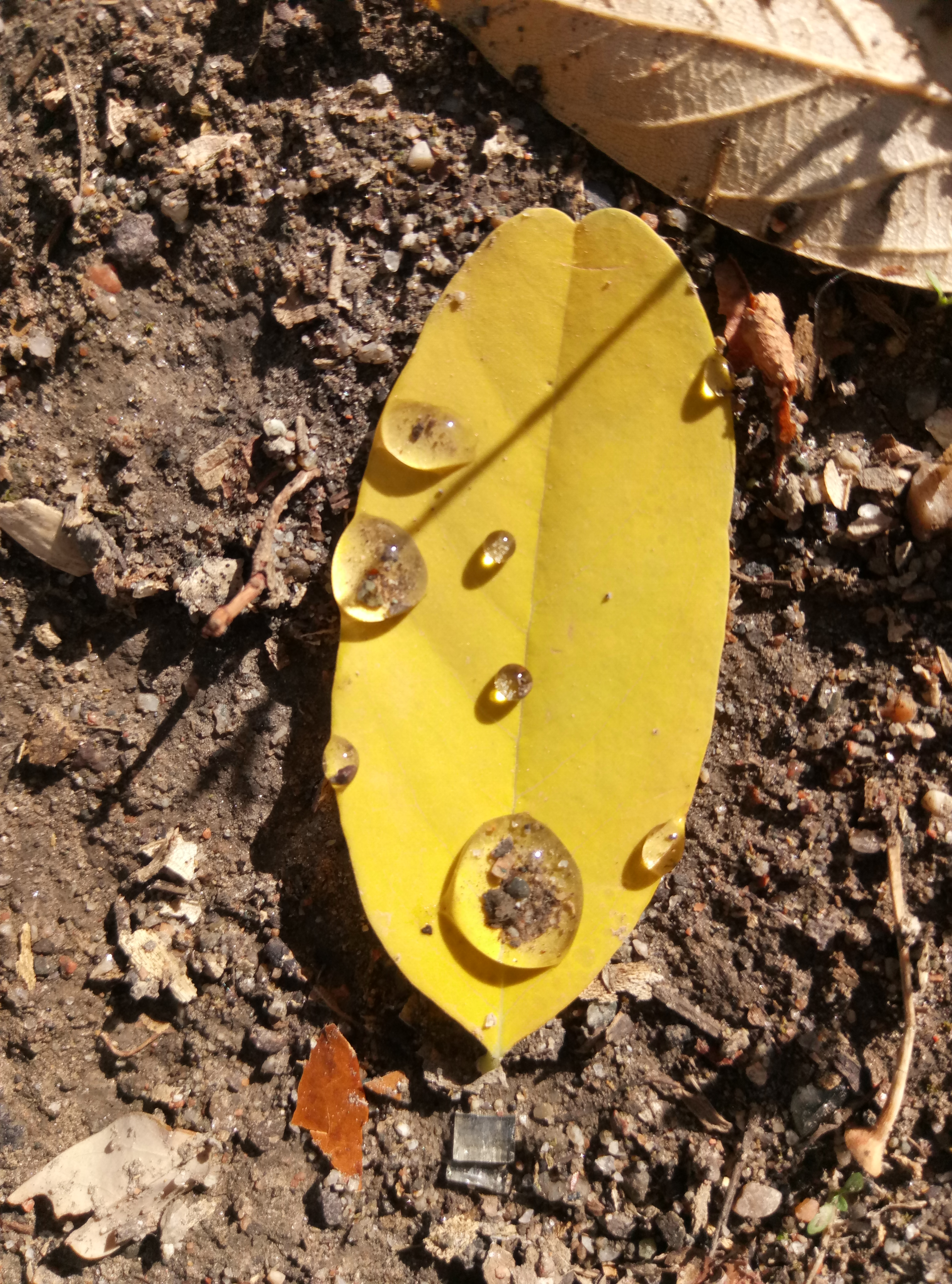
A leaf with droplets on damp soil

Petrichor is associated with a mixture of volatile substances rather than a single chemical compound. Some of these substances originate from plant-derived organic matter and accumulate on mineral surfaces during dry periods. Increasing moisture can displace these materials from the pores of rocks and soil, allowing them to enter the surrounding air. Other contributors include earthy-smelling microbial metabolites such as geosmin and 2-methylisoborneol, produced by bacteria including species of Streptomyces.

Research in 2015 demonstrated that when a raindrop lands on a porous surface, air from the pores can form small bubbles, which rise through the water and burst, releasing aerosols. These aerosols may carry the petrichor scent, as well as microorganisms and other materials from the soil, although the transport of particular biological contaminants was proposed as a possible consequence rather than established directly by the initial experiments. The researchers observed that relatively slow-moving raindrops, characteristic of light or moderate rainfall, could generate more aerosols under suitable surface conditions. They suggested that this might help explain why petrichor is commonly noticed after light rain.

The human nose is particularly sensitive to geosmin, an earthy-smelling terpenoid produced by various microorganisms. Scientific reviews report that humans can detect the compound at concentrations as low as several parts per trillion, although measured detection thresholds vary with experimental conditions. Geosmin is widespread in terrestrial and aquatic environments and may contribute to earthy odours even in the absence of rainfall.

The ecological significance of these microbial odours is an area of continuing research. The attraction of springtails to geosmin and 2-methylisoborneol provides one documented mechanism by which the production of earthy-smelling compounds may benefit soil bacteria through the dispersal of their spores. Suggestions that larger animals, including camels, might use earthy odours to locate water have appeared in scientific discussions, but remain speculative rather than experimentally established.

== See also ==
- Geosmin – a compound contributing to the petrichor scent
- Dimethyl sulfide – a molecule contributing to the odour of the sea
- Mitti attar – a perfume recreating the loamy smell of rain
