= Stoned ape theory =

Theory of cognitive development in early humans

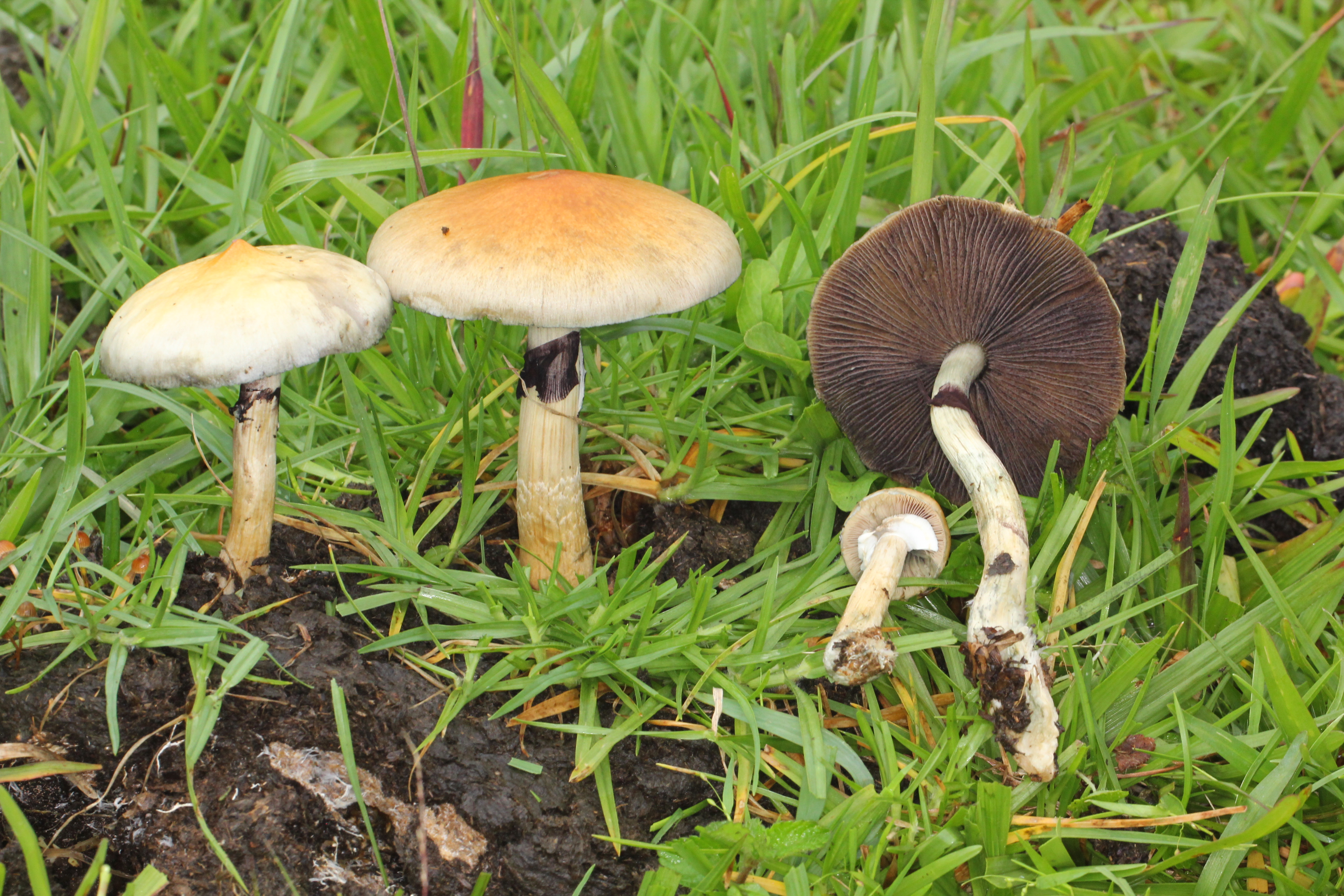
Psilocybe cubensis mushrooms in Coyopolan, Veracruz, Mexico. McKenna and his proponents place these psilocybin mushrooms as the central force in the theory.

The stoned ape theory is a controversial hypothesis first proposed by American ethnobotanist and mystic Terence McKenna in his 1992 book Food of the Gods. The theory holds that cognitive revolution was caused by the addition of psilocybin mushrooms, specifically the mushroom Psilocybe cubensis, into the human diet around 100,000 years ago. Using evidence based primarily on studies by Roland L. Fischer et al. from the 1960s and 1970s, he attributed much of the mental strides made by humans during the cognitive revolution to the effects of psilocybin intake found by Fischer.

McKenna's argument has largely been ignored by the scientific community, who cite numerous alleged discrepancies, as well as a general lack of scientific evidence within his theory, and claim that his conclusions were arrived at via a fundamental misunderstanding of Fischer's studies.

== Overview ==
In his book, McKenna argued that the desertification in Africa caused humans to retreat into shrinking tropical forests, following cattle herds whose dung attracted the insects that he states were certainly a part of the human diet at the time. According to his hypothesis, humans would have detected Psilocybe cubensis from this due to it often growing in cowpats.

According to McKenna, access to and ingestion of mushrooms was an evolutionary advantage to humans' omnivorous hunter-gatherer ancestors, also providing humanity's first religious impulse. He believed that psilocybe mushrooms were the "evolutionary catalyst" from which language, projective imagination, the arts, religion, philosophy, science, and all of human culture sprang.

== Evidence ==
To support his claim, McKenna used studies from the Hungarian-American psychopharmacologist Roland L. Fischer dating back to the 1960s and 1970s to underline the purported effects psychedelics would have had on mankind.

McKenna claimed that minor doses of psilocybin improve visual acuity, including edge detection, which bettered the hunting skills of early primates and thus resulted in greater food supply and reproduction. At higher doses, McKenna contended that the mushrooms would increase libido, attention, and energy, resulting in greater reproductive success. At even higher doses, the psilocybin would promote greater social bonding within early human communities as well as group sex activities, resulting in greater genetic diversity from the mixing of genes. McKenna also theorized that at this level of psilocybin intake, it would trigger activity in "language-forming region of the brain", resulting in the mental development of visions and music and kickstarting the development of language by enriching their troop signals. According to McKenna, psilocybin would also chip away at internal ego and make religious matters the forefront of the mind.

== Variations ==
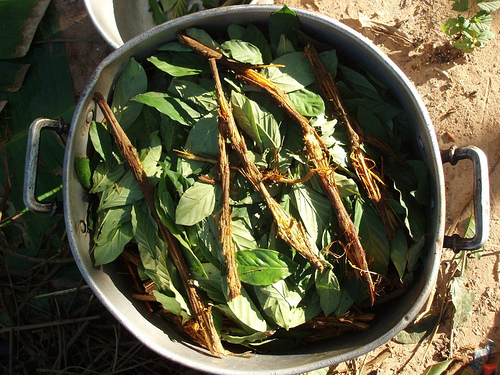
Ayahuasca topped with chacruna. Some proponents believe that instead of psilocybin mushrooms being behind the cognitive revolution that DMT-containing psychedelics such as Ayahuasca were.

Some who hold that the use of drugs played a pivotal role in human development argue that it was not psilocybin that initiated greater cognitive development amongst humans, but was instead spurred by other psychedelics such as DMT-containing substances, in particular, ayahuasca. Ayahuasca has been shown to increase trait openness significantly by one standard deviation. Additionally, it has shown to increase interest in abstract ideas and visual acuity when consumed. This has led to it being hypothesized that some sort of DMT-containing substance was the culprit behind the cognitive revolution. However, psilocin, the active product of psilocybin metabolism, is 4-Hydroxy-DMT and oral ayahuasca has nearly identical pharmacology and pharmacokinetics as ingesting psilocybin mushrooms.

== Reception ==
The stoned ape theory had been widely criticized by the greater scientific community. McKenna's theory was labeled as overly speculative by much of the academic community and misrepresenting the studies of psychopharmacologist Roland L. Fischer, whose research was frequently cited by McKenna as evidence for the purported effects of the mushrooms on early humans. The available evidence does not suggest that psilocybin improves visual acuity, it even tends to demonstrate the contrary. Additionally, some critics pointed to civilizations such as the Aztecs, who used psychedelic mushrooms (at least among the Priestly class), that did not reflect McKenna's model of how psychedelic-using cultures would behave, for example, by carrying out human sacrifice. There are also examples of Amazonian tribes such as the Jivaro and the Yanomami who use ayahuasca ceremoniously and who are known to engage in violent behaviour. This, it has been argued, indicates the use of psychedelic plants does not necessarily suppress the ego and create harmonious societies.

== See also ==
- Aquatic ape theory
- Evolutionary models of human drug use
- Psilocybin
- Psilocybin mushroom
- Drunken monkey hypothesis
