= Evolutionary models of human drug use =

Drug use vs. human evolutionary fitness

Evolutionary models of drug use seek to explain human drug usage from the perspective of evolutionary fitness. Plants, for instance, may provide fitness benefits by relieving pain. Proponents of this model of drug use suggest that the consumption of pharmacological substances for medicinal purposes evolved in the backdrop of human–plant coevolution as a means of self-medication. Humans thus learned to ignore the cues of plant toxicity (e.g., bitter taste) because ingesting the bioactive compounds of plants in small amounts was therapeutic.

The hijack model of substance addiction suggests that psychoactive drugs act on ancient and evolutionarily conserved neural mechanisms associated with positive emotions that evolved to mediate incentive behavior. They induce emotions that in human evolutionary history signaled a benefit for the group. Modern drugs tap into these emotions without passing on any evolutionary advantage. This may explain the modern problems of overuse and addiction.

== Hijack hypothesis ==
The dominant paradigm of drug abuse focuses on human neurobiology and suggests that drug use is the result of reward-related behavior and that drug addiction is a consequence of drug interference with natural reward systems. Specifically, this tradition postulates that the chemical compounds humans seek out increase brain dopamine levels and thereby effectively usurp the mesolimbic pathway, a system originally intended to motivate/reward fitness enhancing behaviors such as those that increase access to food and sex.

From an evolutionary psychiatry viewpoint, susceptibility to addictive behaviours may be understood as a byproduct of neural circuits evolved for reward-seeking in ancestral environments—modern psychoactive substances then "hijack" those circuits in maladaptive ways.

=== History ===
Ideas concerning the neural bases of motivation and reinforcement in behavior can be traced back to the 1950s. In 1953, Olds and Milner published findings implicating a brain region, specifically a cluster of dopamine neurons, with reward-based learning. Addictive substances were later discovered to increase dopamine in the region of the brain associated with reward-based-learning (see: brain stimulation reward).

=== Proximate mechanisms ===
==== Molecular pathways ====
Research on the molecular pathways of addiction suggests that addictive substances, despite their diverse chemical substrates, converge on a common circuitry in the brain's limbic system. Specifically, drugs are thought to activate the mesolimbic dopamine pathway, facilitating dopamine transmission in the nucleus accumbens, via disinhibition, excitation, uptake blockade, etc. to produce a dopamine-like, yet dopamine independent effect.

==== Emotional pathways ====
The hijack model of substance addiction explains that drugs that elicit positive emotion mediate incentive motivation in the nucleus accumbens of the brain. Put another way, addictive substances act on ancient and evolutionarily conserved neural mechanisms associated with positive emotions that evolved to mediate incentive behavior. Psychoactive drugs induce emotions that in human evolutionary history signaled increases in fitness. Positive emotions such as euphoria and excitation are tools chosen by natural selection to help direct the behavior and physiology of an individual towards an increase in Darwinian fitness. For example, in the environment of evolutionary adaptation, humans would feel positive euphoric emotions in response to a successful foraging session or in the event of a successful breeding. Many psychoactive substances provide this same feeling and yet do not produce fitness benefits.

Researchers have shown how emotional disposition is correlated with problematic use of alcohol, wherein if the reason for alcohol consumption is positive, the user is thought to drink to enhance positive feelings with greater control of the substance than if the user's emotional disposition prior to alcoholic consumption was negative. In these cases, the individual is drinking to cope and is shown to have less control over his/her own use. Alcohol mediates negative feelings by their suppression but also encourages the habituated continuance of positive emotion. Recovering alcoholics often report that the reason for relapse is often related to the impulse to compensate for negative feelings, resulting in a motivation to cope and therefore drink.

=== Evolutionary mismatch ===
Drugs such as nicotine, cocaine, alcohol, tetrahydrocannabinol, and opium artificially stimulate the emotions and neural circuits involved in the mesolimbic reward system, thus encouraging drug consumption despite any negative side-effects. The hijack hypothesis suggests that drugs are effective hijackers of neural reward circuitry (e.g. the mesolimbic dopamine system) because they are evolutionarily novel. Specifically proposing that modern-day drug concentrations, methods of delivery, and the existence of certain drugs themselves were not available until recently on an evolutionary time scale, and thus human biology has been slow to adapt and is presently mismatched and susceptible.

To explain how drugs increase dopamine and cause positive emotions while at the same time lowering reproductive fitness, researchers posited that evolutionarily novel drugs hijack the brain's mesolimbic dopamine system and generate a false positive signal of a fitness benefit as well as inhibiting negative effects, to signal a lack of negative fitness consequences. Modern drug addiction fundamentally indicates a false increase of fitness, leading to increasing substance addiction to continue gain, even if the gain is realized as being false. That these drugs create a signal in the brain that indicates, falsely, the arrival of a huge fitness benefit which changes behavioral propensities so that drug-seeking increases in frequency and displaces adaptive behaviors. Proponents of the hijack hypothesis suggest that the paradox of drug reward is due to this evolutionary mismatch, that extant access to psychoactive drug concentrations and products are unmatched by those that existed in the past.

== The paradox of drug reward ==
Why do humans seek out and consume drugs that harm them? The paradox of drug reward refers to the puzzling ability of drugs to induce both aversive and rewarding effects. Despite contention on the particulars of dopamine-induced reward and behavior, there is agreement that dopamine plays an instrumental role in the processing of reward-related stimuli and that drug-induced dopamine stimulation explains at least some part of substance use phenomena. And still, almost all major recreational drugs are plant secondary metabolites or a close chemical analog. The secondary plant compounds from which psychoactive drugs are derived are a form of interspecies defense chemicals that evolved to deter and/or mitigate consumption of the plant soma by herbivores/insects. The compounds from which psychoactive drugs are derived evolved to punish herbivore consumption, not reward it.

=== Human-plant co-evolutionary history ===
Animals evolved to exploit plant tissues and energy stores and in response, plants developed a number of defenses, including neurotoxins. The presence and concentration of these toxins vary by plant tissue, with leaves and organs central to reproduction and energy conservation displaying high toxin concentrations (e.g. pistils/stamens and storage organs) and absent in tissue central to seed dispersion (e.g. fruit). The power and effectiveness of plant neurotoxic substances has been shaped by ~400 million years of evolution. Plant-derived neurotoxins are not evolutionarily novel and human neurophysiology recognizes plant toxins and activates specialized xenobiotic defenses that involve genes, tissue barriers, neural circuits, organ systems, and behaviors to protect against them.

==== Herbivore defense mechanisms ====
Drug toxicity and aversion exist in humans and are at odds with the theory of drug reward. Chronic drug use is harmful in humans and the human brain has evolved defenses to prevent, not reinforce substance use. In response to the evolution of plant chemical defenses, herbivores have co-evolved a number of countermeasures, including (1) compounds that prevent or attenuate induction of plant chemical defenses; (2) detoxification mechanisms, including enzymes and symbiotic relationships with microbes to detoxify or extract nutrients from plant defenses, and cellular membrane carrier proteins for toxin transport; and (3) chemosensors and aversive learning mechanisms that permit selective feeding on less toxic tissues.

==== Human defense mechanisms ====
Human and plant neurotoxin coevolution is evidenced by features of the xenobiotic defense network. Tobacco activates defense mechanisms which researchers suggests it is recognized as toxic not a reward. Nicotine activates bitter taste receptors in the mouth and gut. Ingesting 4–8 mg of nicotine causes burning of the mouth and throat, nausea, aversion, vomiting and diarrhea. In higher doses the effects are more robust and can result in weakness, confusion, dizziness, convulsions, and coma. If consumed in high enough amounts, acute nicotine toxicity can trigger failure of the respiratory system and induce death in human adults within minutes. First-time users of tobacco especially report a variety of unpleasant effects upon administration of nicotine, including nausea, vomiting, gastrointestinal distress, headache, and sweating. This, when taken with the fact that nicotine is a plant toxin that evolved to deter herbivores, suggests instead that the human body naturally recognizes tobacco as a toxic substance, and not a reward.

In addition, research has found genetic evidence that humans have had a long evolutionary history to plant neurotoxins. Sullivan et al. (2008) has noted that humans, like other mammals, have 'inherited' the cytochrome P450 system, which functions to detoxify chemicals found in the environment, including plant neurotoxins. The ubiquity of CYP genes in humans worldwide, including CYP2A6 and CYP2B6, which metabolize nicotine, as well as other drugs, might suggest an evolutionary history with humans and plant neurotoxins. The mammalian body has also evolved to develop defenses against over toxicity, such as exogenous substance metabolism and vomiting reflexes.

== Neurotoxin regulation hypothesis ==
The neurotoxin regulation model of human drug use proposes that during the course of human evolution, plant consumption played a key role. The hypothesis suggests that the compulsory consumption of both the nutrients and neurotoxins in plants selected for a system capable of maximizing the benefits of plant energy extraction while mitigating the cost of plant toxicity. To do this, humans evolved a defense system in which plant consumption is mediated by cues of toxicity in a manner sensitive to the individual's toxicity threshold, maintaining blood toxin concentrations below a critical level.

=== Evidence for toxin regulation ===
Research on herbivores supports the notion of a regulation pathway. Plant toxin concentration informs mammalian herbivore food choices, with herbivores moderating toxicity by capping daily plant intake to accommodate blood toxin concentrations. This mechanism exists across herbivore species and remains static in response to a range of plant toxins, even those that are evolutionarily novel. Similarly, in laboratory conditions, mice have been shown to moderate administration of drugs regardless of dose per injection or the number of lever presses required.

==== Example: Nicotine ====
Evidence of toxin regulation exists across drug types and is present in the case of nicotine. In humans, self-administration of nicotine is moderated such that steady blood concentrations of the toxin are maintained. Moreover, though nicotine is a potent neurotoxin, lethal overdoses are rare and smoking behavior is couched around titration, with number of cigarettes smoked directly tied to changes in nicotine blood concentration. In addition, although typical doses of recreational drugs are often only marginally below the lethal dose, overdose remains rare. For the most part, drug consumption is metered. Thus, proponents of the neurotoxin regulation model of drug use suggest it is highly unlikely that toxin consumption is controlled by the system that motivates and rewards the consumption of macronutrients. Arguing that if drugs and sugar (and other energetically dense foods) stimulate dopamine in the mesolimbic reward system with the same degree of efficiency, then the drug overdose rates should be comparable in scale to the incidence of obesity.

=== Evidence of human brain and plant neurotoxin co-evolution ===
The neurotoxin regulation hypothesis proposes that drug use is not novel because human brains and plant neurotoxins coevolved. Genetic evidence suggests that humans have had regular exposure to plant drugs throughout our evolutionary history. Paleogenetic evidence suggests that the first time human ancestors were exposed and adapted to substantial amount of dietary ethanol, was approximately 10 million years ago. Neurobiological evidence appears to corroborate this story. The fit of allelochemicals within the CNS indicates some coevolutionary activity between mammalian brains and psychoactive plants, meaning they interacted ecologically and therefore responded to one another evolutionarily. This would have only been possible with mammalian CNS exposure to these allelochemicals, therefore to ancient mammalian psychotropic substance use. For example, the mammalian brain has evolved receptor systems for plant substances, such as the opioid receptor system, not available to the mammalian body itself.

=== Neurotoxin regulation hypothesis versus hijack hypothesis ===
The neurotoxin regulation model of drug use is a response to proponents of the hijack hypothesis. Largely this is because the neurobiological reward model of drug use sees interactions between plant neurotoxins and human reward systems as novel and rewarding.

The neurotoxin regulation hypothesis emphasizes the evolutionary biology of plant-human coevolution and maintains that secondary plant metabolites, including alkaloids like nicotine, morphine, and cocaine, are potent neurotoxins that evolved to deter and punish herbivore consumption of the plant soma not encourage/reward it. Researchers highlight that it is evolutionarily disadvantageous for plants to produce toxins that plant predators (e.g. humans) are attracted to, and that it runs contrary to evolutionary logic that plant predators (e.g. humans) would evolve neurobiological systems unprotected from plant toxin consumption.

Proponents of the hijack hypothesis outline a path to addiction that involves drugs co-opting neural reward systems intended for food. However, research on murine models has shown that when the concentration is sufficiently high, sugar operates as a more robust reward than even cocaine. In laboratory conditions, where rats are presented with both a sugar and cocaine sipper, they choose sugar. Researchers use these findings to suggest that sugar reward might generate a stronger dopamine stimulation than cocaine and also may make use of neural mechanisms beyond dopamine stimulation.

Alternative mechanisms explain continued tobacco use: The majority of first time users of cigarettes report adverse reactions, including nausea, dizziness, sickness, and headache. A study by DiFranza et al. (2004) found that 69% of subjects rated inhaling their first cigarette as bad, and nearly three-quarters (72%) reported that their first cigarette made them not want to smoke again. Given the above, opponents of the reward model of drug use suggest it is likely that a mechanism other than a false perception of an increased fitness benefit via hijacking of the brain's mesolimbic dopamine system, is leading to continued tobacco use.

== Pharmacophagy hypothesis ==
Throughout the course of human evolution, the importance of psychoactive plant substances for health has been enormous. Since our earliest ancestors chewed on certain herbs to relieve pain, or wrapped leaves around wounds to improve healing, natural products have often been the only ways of treating disease and injury. Plants provide fitness benefits. Upwards of 25% of all pharmaceutical drugs are from plant-derived sources. The US National Cancer Institute has identified over 3,000 plants that are effective against cancer cells. Almost all major recreational drugs are secondary plant compounds or a close chemical analog. It is well established that in both present and past contexts plants have been used for medicinal purposes.

A core premise of evolutionary theory is that a trait cannot evolve unless it contributes to an individual's reproductive fitness. Proponents of the pharmacophagy hypothesis/medicinal model of drug use suggest that pharmacophagy, the consumption of pharmacological substances for medicinal purposes, evolved in the backdrop of human-plant coevolution as a means of self-medication. Theorists propose that the reason humans learned to ignore the cues of plant toxicity (e.g. bitter taste) and consumed potentially lethal substances with little to no energetic content because ingesting the bioactive compounds of plants in small amounts was therapeutic.

Though the long-term health costs of drug use are undeniable, proponents of the medicinal model of drug use suggest it is possible that regulated consumption of plant neurotoxins was selected. In this regard, researchers have argued that the human brain evolved to control and regulate the intake of psychoactive plant toxins in order to promote reproductive fitness. Broadly, theorists suggest that plant toxins were deliberately ingested by human ancestors to combat macroparasites (e.g. parasitic worms) and/or to ward off disease-carrying vectors (e.g. mosquitos).

=== Nicotine as an anthelminthic ===
For example, researchers have recently sought to understand why humans began using tobacco in spite of the consequences and adverse reactions commonly associated with its use. Hagen and colleagues propose that, as in other species, humans began using tobacco and other plant toxins as a way of controlling infection by parasitic diseases, including helminths. Tobacco, as well as arecoline and cannabis, two other plant neurotoxins that are widely used as recreational drugs in humans, have been found to be toxic to parasitic worms that affect humans and other mammals, as well as plants. Modern anthelminthics function as well by targeting nicotinic acetylcholine receptors (nAChRs) on somatic muscle cells of parasites, producing paralysis and expelling the parasite, the same receptors which are targeted by nicotine (Roulette et al., 2014). Moreover, it has also been found that nicotine is equally or more effective than commercial anthelmintics at killing leeches, including those that infect humans. Similarly, Roulette et al. (2014) found in a study comparing male smoking prevalence and parasite load among Aka hunter-gatherers that treatment with commercial anthelmintics was associated with a decrease in cotinine concentrations (a measure of current tobacco use), thereby supporting their theory that humans regulate the amount of tobacco used in response to current helminth infection. The study also found that men with higher initial tobacco use also had lower worm burdens one year later, suggesting that nicotine not only eliminates parasites, but also protects from reinfection.

== Sexual selection hypothesis ==
Some evolutionary psychological theories concerning drug use suggest individuals consume drugs to increase reproductive opportunities. Drug use can increase reproductive fitness because drug use can (1) advertise biological quality, sexual maturity, or availability, (2) decrease inhibitions in mating contexts, and/or (3) enhance associative learning behaviors that in turn increase mating opportunities. See Richardson et al., 2017 for a review.

=== Costly signaling ===
==== Advertising biological quality ====
Researchers suggest that because variation in drug use susceptibility is in part due to genetic factors, drug consumption could potentially be a costly and honest signal of biological quality. The hypothesis being that humans engage in substance use despite health costs in part to evidence that they can afford to do so. To test the effects substance use had on indicators of mating success researchers tested the effect an individual's fluctuating asymmetry had on the propensity/likelihood to use drugs and found no significant results.

==== Advertising sexual maturity ====
Hagen et al. (2013) suggest that individuals use drug substances to signal maturity. They point out that sexually selected cues of quality often emerge in adolescence (e.g. the peacock's tail) and reliably signal developmental maturity. The teratogenic effects of addictive substances are well documented, as is the fact that psychoactive substances are most harmful to individuals who are developmentally immature. Although this hypothesis remains untested, evidence in support comes from age at onset of drug use. Unequivocally, tobacco consumption does not occur prior to age 11 and in almost all cases, this aligns with age at onset of drug use, as cigarette addicts report having first smoked in adolescence. Hagen et al. suggest the reason drug use most often occurs in adolescent populations is due to the developmental maturity of the adolescent nervous system as well as the increased competition to compete for mates. Consistent with these notions, researchers have found that adolescents with alcohol use disorders were more sexually active, had more sexual partners, and initiated sexual activity at slightly albeit younger ages.

=== Decreasing inhibitions ===
Another possible explanation to the prevalence of substance use is that it contributes to mating success by altering brain functions that lower inhibitions. Generally, people seem to believe substance use will enhance their social behaviors in ways conducive to mating success. Research has shown that many drug types inhibit prefrontal cortex neural activity, the area of the brain responsible conducting long term gains and short term costs. Alcohol myopia theory suggest alcohol lowers inhibitions and amplifies the pre-drinking intention to have sex. Research has also shown that alcohol stimulates dopamine activity in the mesolimbic-dopamine system, which amplifies the salience of natural rewards (e.g. finding food and mates) in the present environment and boost associative learning.

== Evolutionary approaches to age and sex differences in drug use ==
Drug use is not evenly distributed in the population. Research has shown that the prevalence of substance use problems varies in fairly reliable ways according to age, sex, and sociodemographic characteristics. Overall, and across drug categories—including alcohol, coffee, cannabis, and nicotine—men make up the primary drug demographic. Research has also shown that the prevalence of substance use disorders is highest among young adults (ages 18–29), and among individuals of low socioeconomic status.

Application of evolutionary theory to patterns of drug use suggest patterns can be explained in terms of the fundamental trade-offs that occur during different developmental periods as well as gender differences arising from reproductive asymmetry. According to life history theory, individuals have finite energetic resources and thus face energetic allocation decisions concerning investment in maintenance, growth, and reproduction. How resources are allocated to these different tasks in order to most effectively maximize reproductive fitness will depend on the age and sex of the individual and the environmental context the individual exists in.

=== Sex differences ===
Life history predicts that men, especially if they are young, are most likely to engage in drug use because they are most likely to engage in risky behavior and discount the future. Young men have the most to gain from risk-taking behavior because competition for mates, status, and resources is greatest during late adolescence and young adulthood. As men age, they are more likely to develop long-term pair-bonds, accrue status, and have children, thus as men age life-history theory predicts a decrease in risk-taking behavior and a reallocation of energy to parenting rather than mating. The average age at drug initiation occurs in adolescence (ages 15–25) and supports this shift. In contrast, life-history theory predicts that women are less prone to engage in risk-taking behavior because they experience less variance in reproductive success and have more to lose from risk-taking and more to gain from focusing effort on parenting.

==== The fetal protection hypothesis: ====
Almost all major recreational drugs are secondary plant compounds or a close chemical analog and are thus teratogenic, substances known to cause congenital abnormalities and other reproductive harms (e.g. nicotine, carbon monoxide, hydrogen cyanide). Give sex-specific vulnerabilities and fitness costs, the fetal protection hypothesis proposes that selection for increased drug avoidance could have evolved in women to protect them from harming their developing fetuses and nursing infants.

Ancestral women and conditions: In the environment of evolutionary adaptation (EEA), selection pressures shaping avoidance of or defenses against teratogenic substances would have been high. Evidence from evolutionary anthropology suggest ancestral women, similar to women in extant hunter gatherer populations, experienced high fertility and high infant mortality. Importantly, high fertility is characterized by short inter-birth intervals, early age at first birth, and periods of breastfeeding spanning upwards of two years. Given such high reproductive costs, it is likely the fitness cost of ingesting neurotoxins is higher for women than men. One such hunter-gatherer population, the Aka, have incredibly high smoking prevalence rates among men (95%), but very low rates among women (5%).

Drugs and negative fertility endpoints: Studies have shown that fetal exposure to nicotine is associated with a range of negative outcomes before and during parturition as well as for the baby early and later in life. It has also been shown that cigarette smoking has a significant negative effect on the clinical outcome of assisted reproduction treatments, with smokers requiring higher mean gonadotropin doses for ovarian stimulation and requiring nearly twice the number of in vitro fertilization cycles to conceive.

Female specific defenses: Compared to men, women metabolize toxins at faster rates and detect the presence of toxins at lower concentrations. Ovarian hormones have been implicated in the activity of xenobiotic metabolism. Research on pregnant women has documented the differential effects of estrogen and progesterone on the expression of CYPs in response to cigarette smoke. Using hepatic cells, Choi et al., (2012) found that progesterone and estradiol altered drug metabolism but only when hormone concentrations reach that which is normal for pregnancy. Changes in xenobiotic metabolism in women using birth control also suggest hormonally mediated influences. Specifically, changes in hepatic drug elimination for CYP1A2, CYP2C19 and CYP2A6 are similar in pregnant women and non-pregnant women using hormonal contraception. Furthermore, in women across the menstrual cycle, smoking topography variables (e.g. total number of cigarettes smoked, mean puff volume, etc.) seem to be mediated by estradiol and progesterone. In various studies, regular smokers have been shown to produce approximately one-third less estrogens (including estradiol) during the postovulatory menstrual phase than non-smoking counterparts. Research suggests the reason for this relationship is due to a functional tradeoff, with the enzymes that metabolize estradiol instead metabolizing/detoxifying tobacco toxins.

== See also ==
- Drunken monkey hypothesis
- Evolution of the brain
- Evolutionary psychology
- Evolutionary origin of religions
- Stoned ape theory
