= Terence McKenna =

American ethnobotanist, lecturer, and writer (1946–2000)

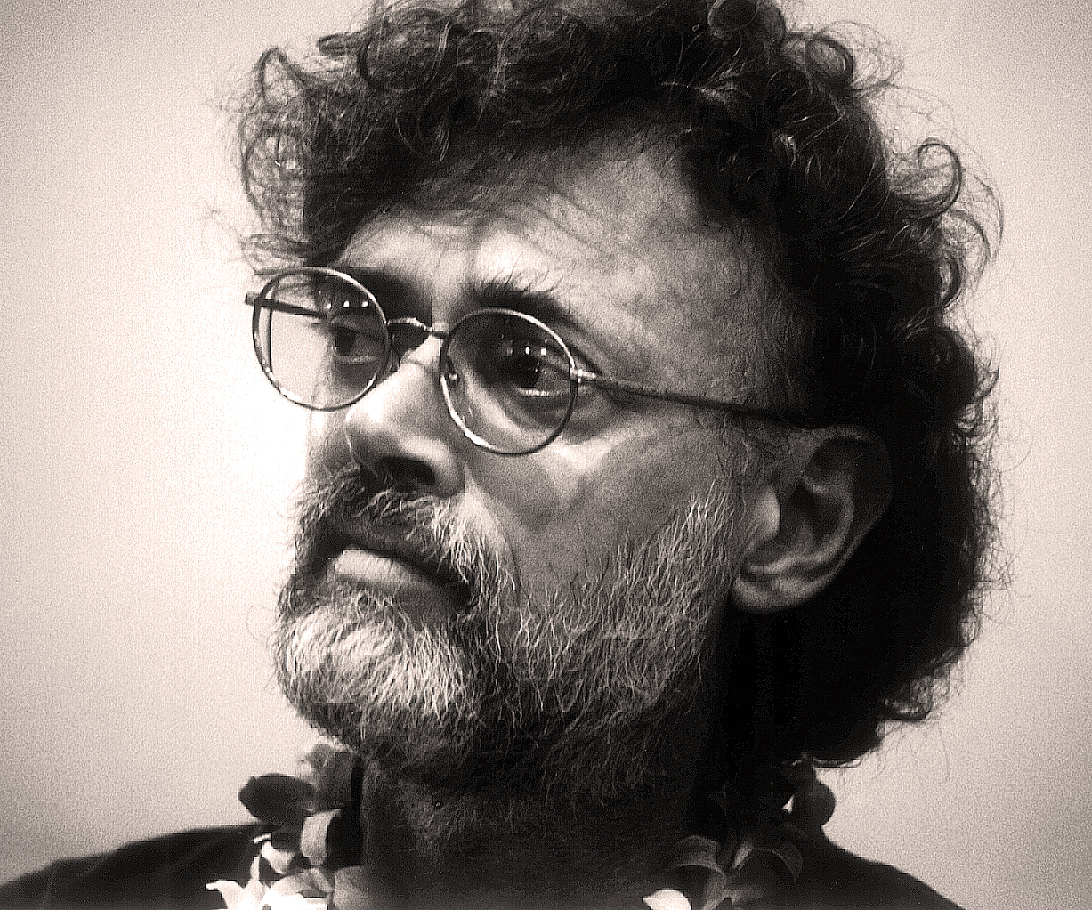
- McKenna in 1999
- Born: November 16, 1946; Paonia, Colorado, U.S.
- Died: April 3, 2000 (aged 53); San Rafael, California, U.S.
- Education: University of California, Berkeley
- Occupations: Author, lecturer
- Spouse: Kathleen Harrison (m. 1975; div. 1992)
- Children: 2
- Relatives: Dennis McKenna (brother)
- Writing career
- Subjects: Shamanism, ethnobotany, ethnomycology, metaphysics, psychedelic drugs, alchemy
- Notable works: The Archaic Revival, Food of the Gods, The Invisible Landscape, Psilocybin Magic Mushroom Grower's Guide, True Hallucinations.
- McKenna's voice On Steven Weinberg's book, The First Three Minutes; Recording date unknown

Terence Kemp McKenna (November 16, 1946 – April 3, 2000) was an American ethnobotanist, lecturer, and author who advocated for the responsible use of naturally occurring psychedelic plants and mushrooms. He spoke and wrote about a variety of subjects, including psychedelic drugs, plant-based entheogens, shamanism, metaphysics, alchemy, language, philosophy, culture, technology, ethnomycology, environmentalism, and the theoretical origins of human consciousness. He was called the "Timothy Leary of the '90s", "one of the leading authorities on the ontological foundations of shamanism", and the "intellectual voice of rave culture". Critical reception of McKenna's work was deeply polarized, with critics accusing him of promoting dangerous ideas and questioning his sanity, while others praised his writing as groundbreaking, humorous, and intellectually provocative.

Born in Colorado, he developed a fascination with nature, psychology, and visionary experiences at a young age. His travels through Asia and South America in the 1960s and '70s shaped his theories on plant-based psychedelics, particularly psilocybin mushrooms, which he helped popularize through cultivation methods and writings. McKenna became a countercultural icon in the 1980s and '90s, delivering lectures on psychedelics, language, and metaphysics while publishing influential books and co-founding Botanical Dimensions in Hawaii. He died in 2000 from brain cancer.

McKenna was a prominent advocate for the responsible use of natural psychedelics—particularly psilocybin mushrooms, ayahuasca, and DMT—which he believed enabled access to profound visionary experiences, alternate dimensions, and communication with intelligent entities. He opposed synthetic drugs and organized religion, favoring shamanic traditions and direct, plant-based spiritual experiences. He speculated that psilocybin mushrooms might be intelligent extraterrestrial life and proposed the controversial "stoned ape" theory, arguing that psychedelics catalyzed human evolution, language, and culture. His broader philosophy envisioned an "archaic revival" as a healing response to the ills of modern civilization.

McKenna formulated a concept about the nature of time based on fractal patterns he claimed to have discovered in the I Ching, which he called novelty theory, proposing that this predicted the end of time, and a transition of consciousness in the year 2012. His promotion of novelty theory and its connection to the Maya calendar is credited as one of the factors leading to the widespread beliefs about the 2012 phenomenon. Novelty theory is considered pseudoscience.

== Biography ==
=== Early life ===
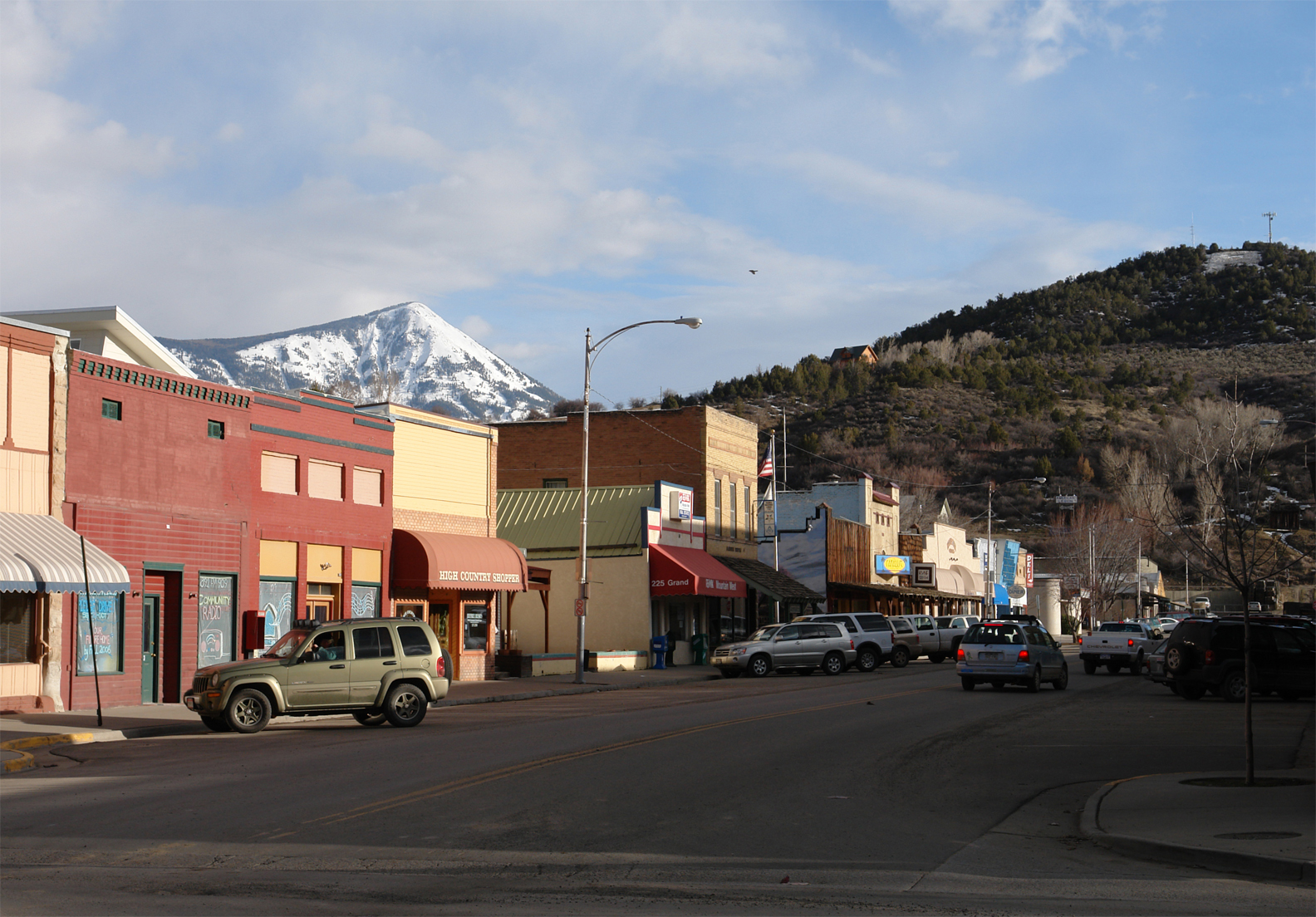
A 2006 photograph of Paonia, Colorado, where McKenna was born

Terence McKenna was born and raised in Paonia, Colorado, with Irish ancestry on his father's side of the family.

As a youth, McKenna had a hobby of fossil-hunting from which he acquired a deep scientific appreciation of nature. At the age of 14, he became interested in psychology after reading Carl Jung's book Psychology and Alchemy. At the age of 14, he first became aware of magic mushrooms when he read the article "Seeking the Magic Mushroom" from the May 13, 1957 edition of Life magazine. He began smoking cannabis as a teenager.

At age 16 McKenna moved to Los Altos, California, to live with family friends for a year. He finished high school in Lancaster, California. In 1963, he was introduced to the literary world of psychedelics through The Doors of Perception and Heaven and Hell by Aldous Huxley and certain issues of The Village Voice which published articles on psychedelics.

McKenna said that one of his early psychedelic experiences with morning glory seeds showed him "that there was something there worth pursuing." But it was his experience with DMT in 1967, introduced to him by his best friend Rick Watson, whom Terence described as his "greatest inspiration", that set his "auto compass for life".

=== Studying and traveling ===
In 1965, McKenna enrolled in the University of California, Berkeley and was accepted into the Tussman Experimental College. While in college in 1967 he began studying shamanism through the study of Tibetan folk religion. That year, which he called his "opium and kabbala phase", he traveled to Jerusalem where he met Kathleen Harrison, an ethnobotanist who later became his wife.

In 1969, McKenna traveled to Nepal led by his interest in Tibetan painting and hallucinogenic shamanism. He sought out shamans of the Tibetan Bon tradition, trying to learn more about the shamanic use of visionary plants. During his time there, he also studied the Tibetan language and worked as a hashish smuggler, until "one of his Bombay-to-Aspen shipments fell into the hands of U. S. Customs." He then wandered through southeast Asia viewing ruins, and spent time as a professional butterfly collector in Indonesia.

After his mother's death from cancer in 1970, McKenna, his brother Dennis, and three friends traveled to the Colombian Amazon in search of oo-koo-hé, a plant preparation containing dimethyltryptamine (DMT). Instead of oo-koo-hé they found fields full of gigantic Psilocybe cubensis mushrooms, which became the new focus of the expedition. In La Chorrera, at the urging of his brother, McKenna was the subject of a psychedelic experiment in which the brothers attempted to "bond harmine DNA with their own neural DNA" (harmine is another psychedelic compound they used synergistically with the mushrooms), through the use of a set of specific vocal techniques. They hypothesised this would give them access to the collective memory of the human species, and would manifest the alchemists' philosopher's stone which they viewed as a "hyperdimensional union of spirit and matter". McKenna claimed the experiment put him in contact with "Logos": an informative, divine voice he believed was universal to visionary religious experience. McKenna also often referred to the voice as "the mushroom", and "the teaching voice" amongst other names. The voice's reputed revelations and his brother's simultaneous peculiar psychedelic experience prompted him to explore the structure of an early form of the I Ching, which led to his "Novelty Theory". During their stay in the Amazon, McKenna also became romantically involved with his interpreter, Ev.

In 1972, McKenna returned to U.C. Berkeley to finish his studies and in 1975, he graduated with a degree in ecology, shamanism, and conservation of natural resources. In the autumn of 1975, after parting with his girlfriend Ev earlier in the year, McKenna began a relationship with his future wife and the mother of his two children, Kathleen Harrison.

Soon after graduating, McKenna and Dennis published a book inspired by their Amazon experiences, The Invisible Landscape: Mind, Hallucinogens and the I Ching. The brothers' experiences in the Amazon were the main focus of McKenna's book True Hallucinations, published in 1993. McKenna also began lecturing locally around Berkeley and started appearing on some underground radio stations.

=== Psilocybin mushroom cultivation ===
Psilocybin: Magic Mushroom Grower's Guide (1986 revised edition)

McKenna, along with his brother Dennis, developed a technique for cultivating psilocybin mushrooms using spores they brought to America from the Amazon. In 1976, the brothers published what they had learned in the book Psilocybin: Magic Mushroom Grower's Guide, under the pseudonyms "O.T. Oss" and "O.N. Oeric". McKenna and his brother were the first to come up with a reliable method for cultivating psilocybin mushrooms at home. As ethnobiologist Jonathan Ott explains, "[the] authors adapted San Antonio's technique (for producing edible mushrooms by casing mycelial cultures on a rye grain substrate; San Antonio 1971) to the production of Psilocybe [Stropharia] cubensis. The new technique involved the use of ordinary kitchen implements, and for the first time the layperson was able to produce a potent entheogen in his [or her] own home, without access to sophisticated technology, equipment, or chemical supplies." When the 1986 revised edition was published, the Magic Mushroom Grower's Guide had sold over 100,000 copies.

=== Mid- to later life ===
==== Public speaking ====
In the early 1980s, McKenna began to speak publicly on the topic of psychedelic drugs, becoming one of the pioneers of the psychedelic movement. His main focus was on the naturally occurring psychedelics such as psilocybin mushrooms (which were the catalyst for his career), ayahuasca, cannabis, and the plant derivative DMT. He conducted lecture tours and workshops promoting natural psychedelics as a way to explore universal mysteries, stimulate the imagination, and re-establish a harmonious relationship with nature. Though associated with the New Age and Human Potential Movements, McKenna himself had little patience for New Age sensibilities. He repeatedly stressed the importance and primacy of the "felt presence of direct experience", as opposed to dogma.

In addition to psychedelic drugs, McKenna spoke on a wide array of subjects, including shamanism; metaphysics; alchemy; language; culture; self-empowerment; environmentalism, techno-paganism; artificial intelligence; evolution; extraterrestrials; science and scientism; the Web; and virtual reality.

It's clearly a crisis of two things: of consciousness and conditioning. These are the two things that the psychedelics attack. We have the technological power, the engineering skills to save our planet, to cure disease, to feed the hungry, to end war. But we lack the intellectual vision, the ability to change our minds. We must decondition ourselves from 10,000 years of bad behavior, and it's not easy.

— Terence McKenna, "This World...and Its Double",

McKenna soon became a fixture of popular counterculture with Timothy Leary once introducing him as "one of the five or six most important people on the planet" and with comedian Bill Hicks' referencing him in his stand-up act and building an entire routine around his ideas. He also became a popular personality in the psychedelic rave/dance scene of the early 1990s, with frequent spoken word performances at raves and contributions to psychedelic and goa trance albums by The Shamen, Spacetime Continuum, Alien Project, Capsula, Entheogenic, Zuvuya, Shpongle, and Shakti Twins. In 1994 he appeared as a speaker at the Starwood Festival, documented in the book Tripping by Charles Hayes.

McKenna published several books in the early-to-mid-1990s including: The Archaic Revival; Food of the Gods; and True Hallucinations. Hundreds of hours of his public lectures were recorded either professionally or bootlegged and have been produced on cassette tape, CD and MP3. Segments of his talks have gone on to be sampled by many musicians and DJs.

McKenna was a colleague and close friend of chaos mathematician Ralph Abraham, and author and biologist Rupert Sheldrake. He conducted several public and many private debates with them from 1982 until his death. These debates were known as trialogues and some of the discussions were later published in the books: Trialogues at the Edge of the West and The Evolutionary Mind.

==== Botanical Dimensions ====
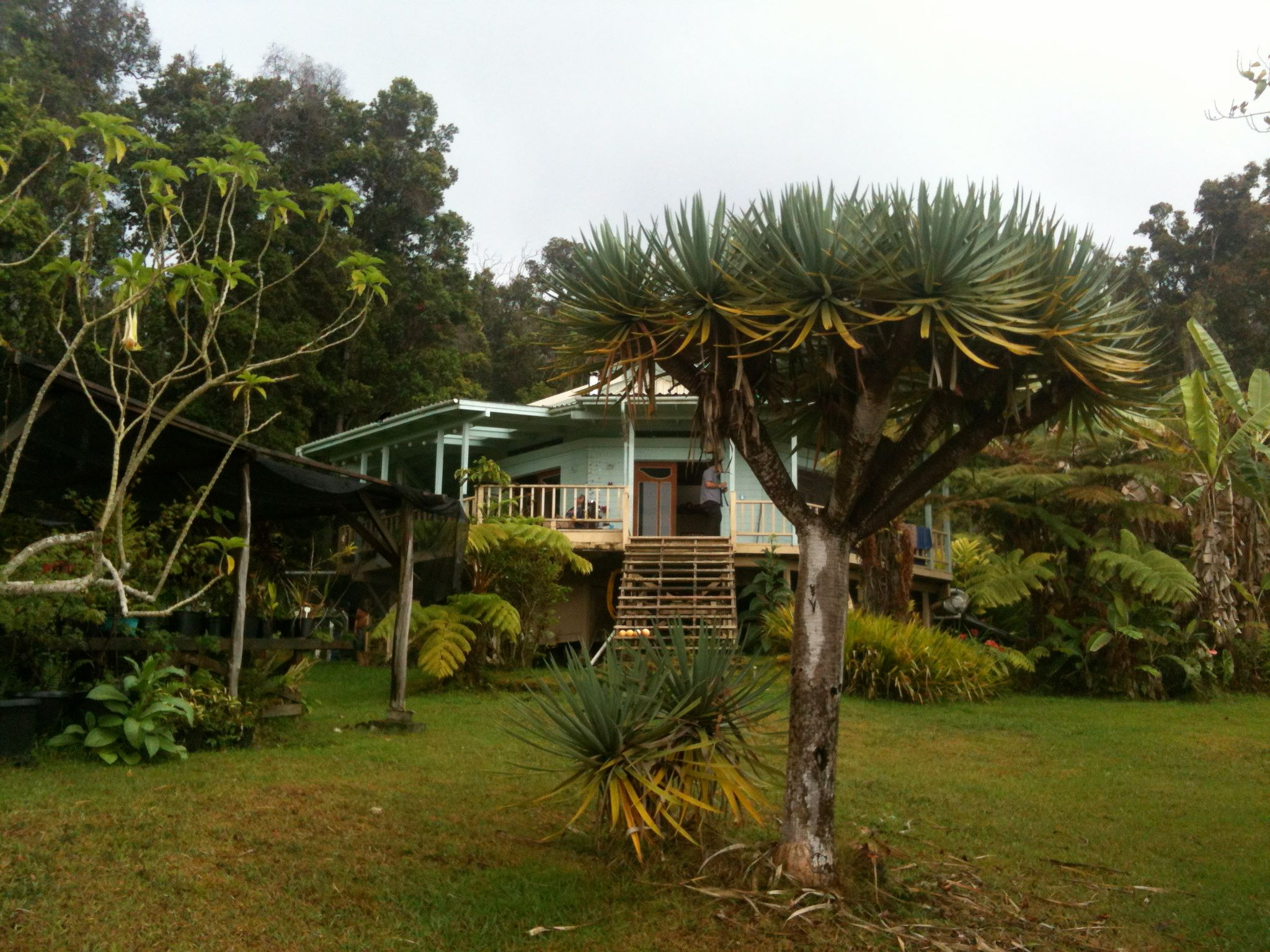
Botanical Dimensions ethnobotanical preserve in Hawaii

In 1985, McKenna founded Botanical Dimensions with his then-wife, Kathleen Harrison. Botanical Dimensions is a nonprofit ethnobotanical preserve on the Big Island of Hawaii, established to collect, protect, propagate, and understand plants of ethno-medical significance and their lore, and appreciate, study, and educate others about plants and mushrooms felt to be significant to cultural integrity and spiritual well-being. The 19-acre (7.7 ha) botanical garden is a repository containing thousands of plants that have been used by indigenous people of the tropical regions, and includes a database of information related to their purported healing properties. McKenna was involved until 1992, when he retired from the project, following his and Kathleen's divorce earlier in the year. Kathleen still manages Botanical Dimensions as its president and projects director.

After their divorce, McKenna moved to Hawaii permanently, where he built a modernist house and created a gene bank of rare plants near his home. Previously, he had split his time between Hawaii and Occidental, California.

=== Death ===
McKenna was a longtime sufferer of migraines, but on 22 May 1999 he began to have unusually extreme and painful headaches. In addition to the headaches, he described entering a powerful altered state of consciousness with hallucinations and perceptual distortions in conjunction with multiple seizures. Then his blood pressure dropped and he collapsed. He was taken to the hospital and diagnosed with glioblastoma multiforme, a highly aggressive form of brain cancer. For the next several months he underwent various treatments, including experimental gamma knife radiation treatment. According to Wired magazine, McKenna was worried that his tumor may have been caused by his psychedelic drug use, or his 35 years of daily cannabis smoking; however, his doctors assured him there was no causal relation.

In late 1999, McKenna described his thoughts concerning his impending death to interviewer Erik Davis:

I always thought death would come on the freeway in a few horrifying moments, so you'd have no time to sort it out. Having months and months to look at it and think about it and talk to people and hear what they have to say, it's a kind of blessing. It's certainly an opportunity to grow up and get a grip and sort it all out. Just being told by an unsmiling guy in a white coat that you're going to be dead in four months definitely turns on the lights. ... It makes life rich and poignant. When it first happened, and I got these diagnoses, I could see the light of eternity, à la William Blake, shining through every leaf. I mean, a bug walking across the ground moved me to tears.

McKenna died at a friend's home in San Rafael, California, on April 3, 2000, at the age of 53.

=== Library fire and insect collection ===
McKenna's library of over 3,000 rare books and personal notes was destroyed in a fire in Monterey, California, on February 7, 2007. An index of McKenna's library was preserved by his brother Dennis.

McKenna studied Lepidoptera and entomology in the 1960s, and his studies included hunting for butterflies, primarily in Colombia and Indonesia, creating a large collection of insect specimens. After McKenna's death, his daughter, the artist and photographer Klea McKenna, preserved his insect collection, turning it into a gallery installation, then publishing The Butterfly Hunter, a book of 122 insect photos from a set of over 2,000 specimens McKenna collected between 1969 and 1972, alongside maps of his collecting routes through rainforests in Southeast Asia and South America. McKenna's insect collection was consistent with his interest in Victorian-era explorers and naturalists, and his worldview based on close observation of nature. In the 1970s, when he was still collecting, he became quite squeamish and guilt-ridden about the necessity of killing butterflies in order to collect and classify them, according to McKenna's daughter; this led him to cease his entomological studies.

== Thought ==
=== Psychedelics ===
McKenna advocated the exploration of altered states of mind via the ingestion of naturally occurring psychedelic substances, particularly psychedelic mushrooms and DMT. He was less enthralled with synthetic drugs, stating, "I think drugs should come from the natural world and be use-tested by shamanically orientated cultures ... one cannot predict the long-term effects of a drug produced in a laboratory."

People should be very careful. I said earlier in this talk that I was addressing experimentalists, psychologists, psychiatrists. I don’t mean to scare anyone off, but you should build up to it. These are bizarre dimensions of extraordinary power and beauty, and I don’t believe there’s any set rule for acquiring [the] power to not be overwhelmed, but I think moving carefully, reflecting a great deal, always trying to map it back on the history of the race and the philosophical and religious accomplishments of the species—this should always be done. [...] All drugs are dangerous. All drugs, at sufficient doses or repeated over a sufficient amount of time, there are risks. The possibility of kindling epileptic effects is well known in ketamine. There’s a stack of literature on that, if anybody is intending to do ketamine who hasn’t done it. The first place you go when you’re going to take a new drug is the library.

McKenna often described his practice of taking what he called "heroic doses" of psilocybin mushrooms: five dried grams, taken alone, on an empty stomach, in silent darkness, and with eyes closed. He said that when taken this way one could expect a profound visionary experience.

Although McKenna avoided giving his allegiance to any one interpretation (part of his rejection of monotheism), he was open to the idea of psychedelics as being "trans-dimensional travel". He proposed that DMT sent one to a "parallel dimension" and that psychedelics literally enabled an individual to encounter "higher dimensional entities", or what could be ancestors, or spirits of the Earth, saying that if you can trust your own perceptions it appears that you are entering an "ecology of souls". McKenna also put forward the idea that psychedelics were "doorways into the Gaian mind", suggesting that "the planet has a kind of intelligence, it can actually open a channel of communication with an individual human being" and that the psychedelic plants were the facilitators of this communication.

==== Machine elves ====
McKenna spoke of hallucinations while on DMT in which he met intelligent entities he described as "self-transforming machine elves".

==== Psilocybin panspermia speculation ====
In a more radical version of biophysicist Francis Crick's hypothesis of directed panspermia, McKenna speculated on the idea that psilocybin mushrooms may be a species of high intelligence, which may have arrived on this planet as spores migrating through space and which are attempting to establish a symbiotic relationship with human beings. He postulated that "intelligence, not life, but intelligence may have come here [to Earth] in this spore-bearing life form". He said, "I think that theory will probably be vindicated. I think in a hundred years if people do biology they will think it quite silly that people once thought that spores could not be blown from one star system to another by cosmic radiation pressure," and also believed that "few people are in a position to judge its extraterrestrial potential, because few people in the orthodox sciences have ever experienced the full spectrum of psychedelic effects that are unleashed".

==== Opposition to organized religion ====
McKenna was opposed to Christianity and most forms of organized religion or guru-based forms of spiritual awakening, favouring shamanism, which he believed was the broadest spiritual paradigm available, stating that:

What I think happened is that in the world of prehistory all religion was experiential, and it was based on the pursuit of ecstasy through plants. And at some time, very early, a group interposed itself between people and direct experience of the 'Other.' This created hierarchies, priesthoods, theological systems, castes, ritual, taboos. Shamanism, on the other hand, is an experiential science that deals with an area where we know nothing. It is important to remember that our epistemological tools have developed very unevenly in the West. We know a tremendous amount about what is going on in the heart of the atom, but we know absolutely nothing about the nature of the mind.

==== Technological singularity ====
During the final years of his life and career, McKenna became very engaged in the theoretical realm of technology. He was an early proponent of the technological singularity and in his last recorded public talk, Psychedelics in the age of intelligent machines, he outlined ties between psychedelics, computation technology, and humans. He also became enamored with the Internet, calling it "the birth of [the] global mind", believing it to be a place where psychedelic culture could flourish.

==== Admired writers ====
Either philosophically or religiously, he expressed admiration for Marshall McLuhan, Alfred North Whitehead, Pierre Teilhard de Chardin, Carl Jung, Plato, Gnostic Christianity, and Alchemy, while regarding the Greek philosopher Heraclitus as his favorite philosopher.

McKenna also expressed admiration for the works of writers Aldous Huxley, James Joyce, whose book Finnegans Wake he called "the quintessential work of art, or at least work of literature of the 20th century," science fiction writer Philip K. Dick, whom he described as an "incredible genius", fabulist Jorge Luis Borges, with whom McKenna shared the belief that "scattered through the ordinary world there are books and artifacts and perhaps people who are like doorways into impossible realms, of impossible and contradictory truth" and Vladimir Nabokov. McKenna once said that he would have become a Nabokov lecturer if he had never encountered psychedelics.

=== "Stoned ape" theory of human evolution ===
McKenna's hypothesis concerning the influence of psilocybin mushrooms on human evolution is known as "the 'stoned ape' theory".

In his 1992 book Food of the Gods, McKenna proposed that the transformation from humans' early ancestors Homo erectus to the species Homo sapiens mainly involved the addition of the mushroom Psilocybe cubensis in the diet, an event that according to his theory took place about 100,000 BCE (when he believed humans diverged from the genus Homo). McKenna based his theory on the effects, or alleged effects, produced by the mushroom while citing studies by Roland Fischer et al. from the late 1960s to early 1970s.

McKenna stated that, due to the desertification of the African continent at that time, human forerunners were forced from the shrinking tropical canopy into search of new food sources. He believed they would have been following large herds of wild cattle whose dung harbored the insects that, he proposed, were undoubtedly part of their new diet, and would have spotted and started eating Psilocybe cubensis, a dung-loving mushroom often found growing out of cowpats.

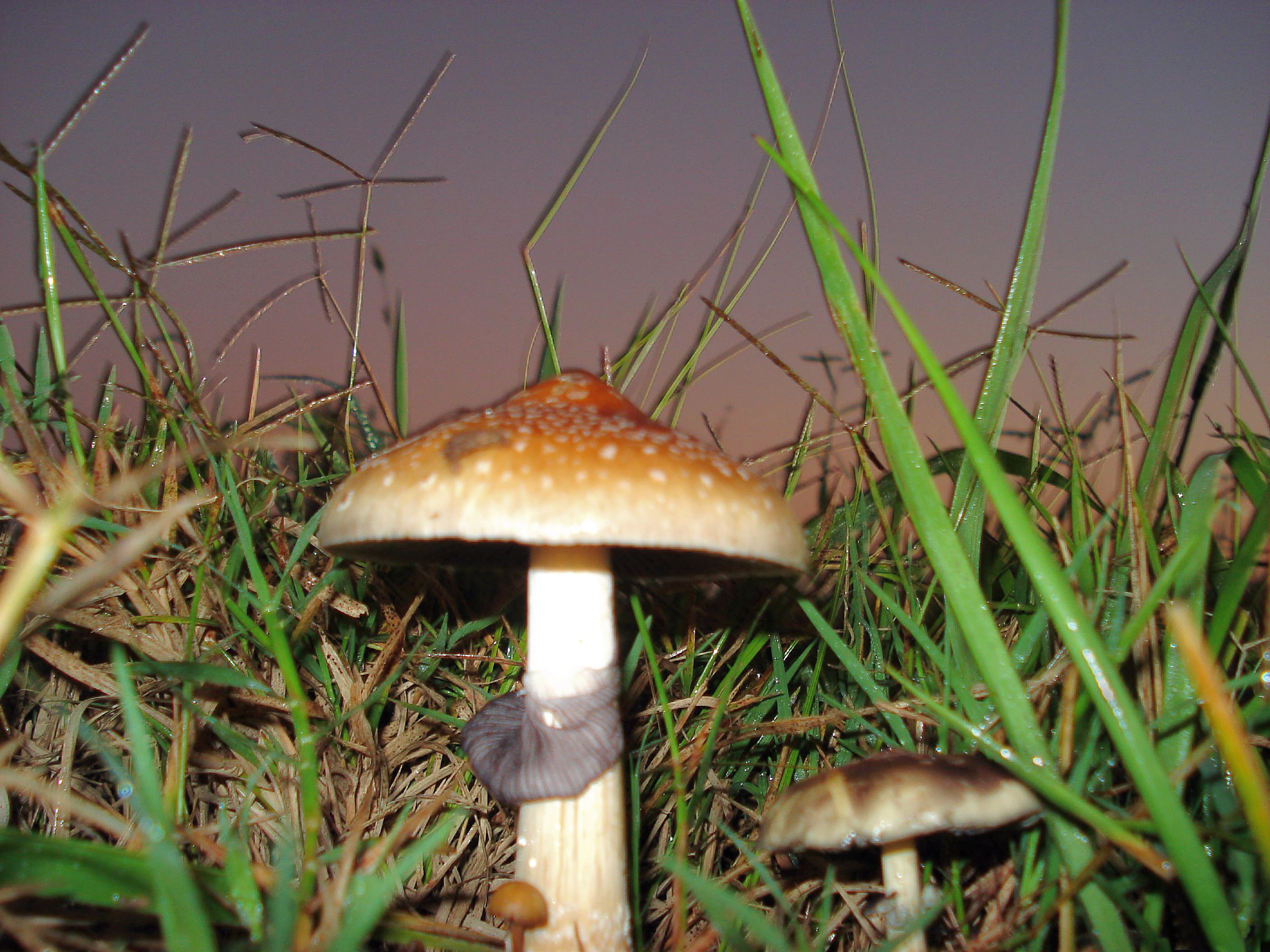
Psilocybe cubensis, the psilocybin-containing mushroom central to McKenna's "stoned ape" theory of human evolution

McKenna's hypothesis was that low doses of psilocybin improve visual acuity, particularly edge detection, meaning that the presence of psilocybin in the diet of early pack hunting primates caused the individuals who were consuming psilocybin mushrooms to be better hunters than those who were not, resulting in an increased food supply and in turn a higher rate of reproductive success. Then at slightly higher doses, he contended, the mushroom acts to sexually arouse, leading to a higher level of attention, more energy in the organism, and potential erection in the males, rendering it even more evolutionarily beneficial, as it would result in more offspring. At even higher doses, McKenna proposed that the mushroom would have acted to "dissolve boundaries", promoting community bonding and group sexual activities. Consequently, there would be a mixing of genes, greater genetic diversity, and a communal sense of responsibility for the group offspring. At these higher doses, McKenna also argued that psilocybin would be triggering activity in the "language-forming region of the brain", manifesting as music and visions, thus catalyzing the emergence of language in early hominids by expanding "their arboreally evolved repertoire of troop signals". He also pointed out that psilocybin would dissolve the ego and "religious concerns would be at the forefront of the tribe's consciousness, simply because of the power and strangeness of the experience itself."

According to McKenna, access to and ingestion of mushrooms was an evolutionary advantage to humans' omnivorous hunter-gatherer ancestors, also providing humanity's first religious impulse. He believed that psilocybin mushrooms were the "evolutionary catalyst" from which language, projective imagination, the arts, religion, philosophy, science, and all of human culture sprang.

==== Criticism ====
McKenna's "stoned ape" theory has not received attention from the scientific community and has been criticized for a relative lack of citation to any of the paleoanthropological evidence informing our understanding of human origins. His ideas regarding psilocybin and visual acuity have been criticized as misrepresentations of Fischer et al.'s findings, who published studies of visual perception parameters other than acuity. Criticism has also noted a separate study on psilocybin-induced transformation of visual space, wherein Fischer et al. stated that psilocybin "may not be conducive to the survival of the organism". There is a lack of scientific evidence that psilocybin increases sexual arousal, and even if it does, it would not necessarily entail an evolutionary advantage. Others have pointed to civilizations such as the Aztecs, who used psychedelic mushrooms (at least among the priestly class), that did not reflect McKenna's model of how psychedelic-using cultures would behave, for example, by carrying out human sacrifice. There are also examples of Amazonian tribes such as the Jivaro and the Yanomami who use ayahuasca ceremoniously and who are known to engage in violent behaviour. This, it has been argued, indicates the use of psychedelic plants does not necessarily suppress the ego and create harmonious societies.

=== Archaic revival ===
One of the main themes running through McKenna's work, and the title of his second book, was the idea that Western civilization was undergoing what he called an "archaic revival".

His hypothesis was that Western society has become "sick" and is undergoing a "healing process": In the same way that the human body begins to produce antibodies when it feels itself to be sick, humanity as a collective whole (in the Jungian sense) was creating "strategies for overcoming the condition of disease" and trying to cure itself, by what he termed as "a reversion to archaic values". McKenna pointed to phenomena including surrealism, abstract expressionism, body piercing and tattooing, psychedelic drug use, sexual permissiveness, jazz, experimental dance, rave culture, rock and roll and catastrophe theory, amongst others, as his evidence that this process was underway. This idea is linked to McKenna's "stoned ape" theory of human evolution, with him viewing the "archaic revival" as an impulse to return to the symbiotic and blissful relationship he believed humanity once had with the psilocybin mushroom.

In differentiating his idea from the "New Age", a term that he felt trivialized the significance of the next phase in human evolution, McKenna stated that: "The New Age is essentially humanistic psychology '80s-style, with the addition of neo-shamanism, channeling, crystal and herbal healing. The archaic revival is a much larger, more global phenomenon that assumes that we are recovering the social forms of the late neolithic, and reaches far back in the 20th century to Freud, to surrealism, to abstract expressionism, even to a phenomenon like National Socialism which is a negative force. But the stress on ritual, on organized activity, on race/ancestor-consciousness – these are themes that have been worked out throughout the entire 20th century, and the archaic revival is an expression of that."

=== Novelty theory and Timewave Zero ===
Novelty theory is a pseudoscientific idea that purports to predict the ebb and flow of novelty in the universe as an inherent quality of time, proposing that time is not a constant but has various qualities tending toward either "habit" or "novelty". Habit, in this context, can be thought of as entropic, repetitious, or conservative; and novelty as creative, disjunctive, or progressive phenomena. McKenna's idea was that the universe is an engine designed for the production and conservation of novelty and that as novelty increases, so does complexity. With each level of complexity achieved becoming the platform for a further ascent into complexity.

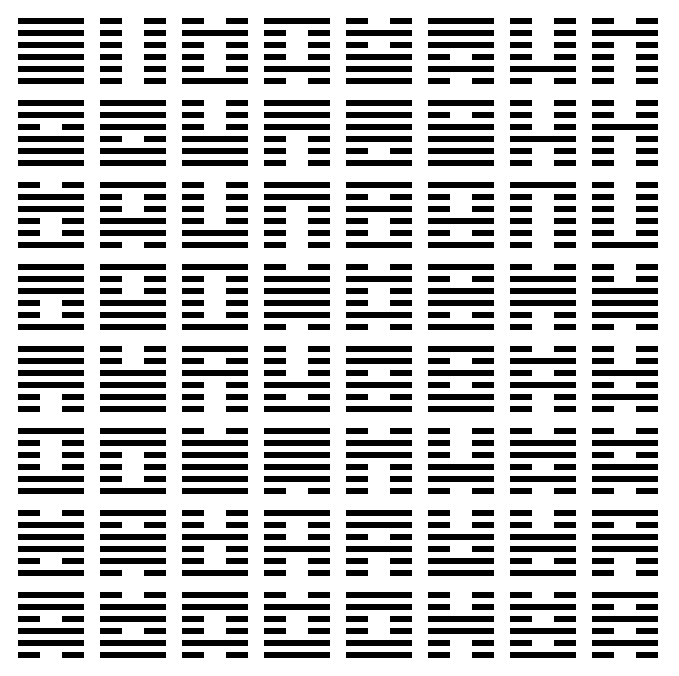
The 64 hexagrams from the King Wen sequence of the I Ching

The basis of the theory was conceived in the mid-1970s after McKenna's experiences with psilocybin mushrooms at La Chorrera in the Amazon led him to closely study the King Wen sequence of the I Ching.

In Asian Taoist philosophy, opposing phenomena are represented by the yin and yang. Both are always present in everything, yet the amount of influence of each varies over time. The individual lines of the I Ching are made up of both Yin (broken lines) and Yang (solid lines).

When examining the King Wen sequence of 64 hexagrams, McKenna noticed a pattern. He analysed the "degree of difference" between the hexagrams in each successive pair and claimed he found a statistical anomaly, which he believed suggested that the King Wen sequence was intentionally constructed, with the sequence of hexagrams ordered in a highly structured and artificial way, and that this pattern codified the nature of time's flow in the world. With the degrees of difference as numerical values, McKenna worked out a mathematical wave form based on the 384 lines of change that make up the 64 hexagrams. He was able to graph the data and this became the Novelty Time Wave.

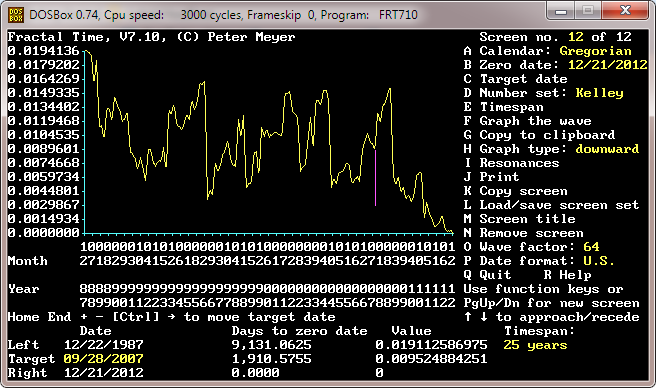
A screenshot of the Timewave Zero software (written by Peter J. Meyer) showing the timewave for the 25 years preceding a zero date of December 21, 2012

Peter J. Meyer (Peter Johann Gustav Meyer), in collaboration with McKenna, studied and developed novelty theory, working out a mathematical formula and developing the Timewave Zero software (the original version of which was completed by July 1987), enabling them to graph and explore its dynamics on a computer. The graph was fractal: It exhibited a pattern in which a given small section of the wave was found to be identical in form to a larger section of the wave. McKenna called this fractal modeling of time "temporal resonance", proposing it implied that larger intervals, occurring long ago, contained the same amount of information as shorter, more recent, intervals. He suggested the up-and-down oscillation of the wave shows an ongoing wavering between habit and novelty respectively. With each successive iteration trending, at an increasing level, towards infinite novelty. So according to novelty theory, the pattern of time itself is speeding up, with a requirement of the theory being that infinite novelty will be reached on a specific date.

McKenna believed that events in history could be identified that would help him locate the time wave end date and attempted to find the best-fit of the graph to the data field of human history. The last harmonic of the wave has a duration of 67.29 years. Population growth, peak oil, and pollution statistics were some of the factors that pointed him to an early twenty-first century end date and when looking for a particularly novel event in human history as a signal that the final phase had begun McKenna picked the dropping of the atomic bomb on Hiroshima. This adjusted his graph to reach zero in mid-November 2012. When he later discovered that the end of the 13th baktun in the Maya calendar had been correlated by Western Maya scholars as December 21, 2012, (Note: Most Mayanist scholars, such as Mark Van Stone and Anthony Aveni, adhere to the "GMT (Goodman-Martinez-Thompson) correlation" with the Long Count, which places the start date at 11 August 3114 BC and the end date of b'ak'tun 13 at December 21, 2012. This date was also the overwhelming preference of those who believed in 2012 eschatology, arguably, Van Stone suggests, because it was a solstice, and was thus astrologically significant. Some Mayanist scholars, such as Michael D. Coe, Linda Schele and Marc Zender, adhere to the "Lounsbury/GMT+2" correlation, which sets the start date at August 13 and the end date at December 23. Which of these is a better correlation remained unsettled. Coe's initial date was "24 December 2011." He revised it to "11 January AD 2013" in the 1980 2nd edition of his book, not settling on December 23, 2012 until the 1984 3rd edition. The correlation of b'ak'tun 13 as December 21, 2012 first appeared in Table B.2 of Robert J. Sharer's 1983 revision of the 4th edition of Sylvanus Morley's book The Ancient Maya.) he adopted their end date instead. (Note: The 1975 first edition of McKenna's The Invisible Landscape refers to 2012 (but no specific day during the year) only twice. In the 1993 second edition, McKenna employed December 21, 2012 throughout, the date arrived at by the Mayanist researcher Robert J. Sharer.)

McKenna saw the universe, in relation to novelty theory, as having a teleological attractor at the end of time, which increases interconnectedness and would eventually reach a singularity of infinite complexity. He also frequently referred to this as "the transcendental object at the end of time." When describing this model of the universe he stated that: "The universe is not being pushed from behind. The universe is being pulled from the future toward a goal that is as inevitable as a marble reaching the bottom of a bowl when you release it up near the rim. If you do that, you know the marble will roll down the side of the bowl, down, down, down – until eventually it comes to rest at the lowest energy state, which is the bottom of the bowl. That's precisely my model of human history. I'm suggesting that the universe is pulled toward a complex attractor that exists ahead of us in time, and that our ever-accelerating speed through the phenomenal world of connectivity and novelty is based on the fact that we are now very, very close to the attractor." Therefore, according to McKenna's final interpretation of the data and positioning of the graph, on December 21, 2012, we would have been in the unique position in time where maximum novelty would be experienced. An event he described as a "concrescence", a "tightening 'gyre'" with everything flowing together. Speculating that "when the laws of physics are obviated, the universe disappears, and what is left is the tightly bound plenum, the monad, able to express itself for itself, rather than only able to cast a shadow into physis as its reflection...It will be the entry of our species into 'hyperspace', but it will appear to be the end of physical laws, accompanied by the release of the mind into the imagination."

Novelty theory is considered to be pseudoscience. Among the criticisms are the use of numerology to derive dates of important events in world history, the arbitrary rather than calculated end date of the time wave and the apparent adjustment of the eschaton from November 2012 to December 2012 in order to coincide with the Maya calendar. Other purported dates do not fit the actual time frames: the date claimed for the emergence of Homo sapiens is inaccurate by 70,000 years, and the existence of the ancient Sumer and Egyptian civilisations contradict the date he gave for the beginning of "historical time". Some projected dates have been criticized for having seemingly arbitrary labels, such as the "height of the age of mammals" and McKenna's analysis of historical events has been criticised for having a eurocentric and cultural bias.

==== The Watkins Objection ====
The British mathematician Matthew Watkins of Exeter University conducted a mathematical analysis of the Time Wave, and argued there were mathematical flaws in its construction.

== Critical reception ==
Judy Corman, vice president of the Phoenix House of New York, attacked McKenna for popularizing "dangerous substances". In a 1993 letter to The New York Times, he wrote that: "surely the fact that Terence McKenna says that the psilocybin mushroom 'is the megaphone used by an alien, intergalactic Other to communicate with mankind' is enough for us to wonder if taking LSD has done something to his mental faculties." The same year, in his True Hallucinations review for The New York Times, Peter Conrad wrote: "I suffered hallucinatory agonies of my own while reading his shrilly ecstatic prose".

Reviewing Food of the Gods, Richard Evans Schultes wrote in American Scientist that the book was "a masterpiece of research and writing" and that it "should be read by every specialist working in the multifarious fields involved with the use of psychoactive drugs". Concluding that, "[i]t is, without question, destined to play a major role in our future considerations of the role of the ancient use of psychoactive drugs, the historical shaping of our modern concerns about drugs and perhaps about man's desire for escape from reality with drugs."

In 1994, Tom Hodgkinson wrote for The New Statesman and Society, that "to write him off as a crazy hippie is a rather lazy approach to a man not only full of fascinating ideas but also blessed with a sense of humor and self-parody".

In a 1992 issue of Esquire magazine, Mark Jacobson wrote of True Hallucinations that, "it would be hard to find a drug narrative more compellingly perched on a baroquely romantic limb than this passionate Tom-and-Huck-ride-great-mother-river-saga of brotherly bonding," adding "put simply, Terence is a hoot!"

Wired called him a "charismatic talking head" who was "brainy, eloquent, and hilarious", and Jerry Garcia of the Grateful Dead also said that he was "the only person who has made a serious effort to objectify the psychedelic experience".

== Publications ==
=== Books ===
- McKenna, Terence; McKenna, Dennis (1975). The Invisible Landscape: Mind, Hallucinogens, and the I Ching. New York: Seabury. ISBN 978-0-8164-9249-7.
- McKenna, Terence; McKenna, Dennis (1976). Psilocybin: Magic Mushroom Grower's Guide. Under the pseudonyms OT Oss and ON Oeric. Berkeley, CA: And/Or Press. ISBN 978-0-915904-13-6.
- McKenna, Terence (1991). The Archaic Revival: Speculations on Psychedelic Mushrooms, the Amazon, Virtual Reality, UFOs, Evolution, Shamanism, the Rebirth of the Goddess, and the End of History. San Francisco: Harper San Francisco. ISBN 978-0-06-250613-9.
- McKenna, Terence (1992a). Food of the Gods: The Search for the Original Tree of Knowledge – A Radical History of Plants, Drugs, and Human Evolution. New York: Bantam. ISBN 978-0-553-07868-8.
- McKenna, Terence (1992b). Synesthesia. Illustrated by Ely, Timothy C. New York: Granary Books. OCLC 30473682.
- Sheldrake, Rupert; McKenna, Terence; Abraham, Ralph H. (1992). Trialogues at the Edge of the West: Chaos, Creativity, and the Resacralization of the World. Forward by Houston, Jean. Bear & Company. ISBN 978-0-939680-97-9.
- McKenna, Terence (1993). True Hallucinations: Being an Account of the Author's Extraordinary Adventures in the Devil's Paradise. San Francisco: Harper San Francisco. ISBN 978-0-06-250545-3.
- Sheldrake, Rupert; McKenna, Terence; Abraham, Ralph H. (1998). The Evolutionary Mind: Conversations on Science, Imagination & Spirit. Monkfish Book Publishing. ISBN 978-0-9749359-7-3.

=== Spoken word ===
- History Ends in Green: Gaia, Psychedelics and the Archaic Revival, 6 audiocassette set, Mystic Fire audio, 1993, ISBN 978-1-56176-907-0 (recorded at the Esalen Institute, 1989)
- TechnoPagans at the End of History (transcription of rap with Mark Pesce from 1998)
- Psychedelics in the Age of Intelligent Machines (1999) (DVD) HPX/SurrealStudio
- Conversations on the Edge of Magic (1994) (CD & Cassette) ACE
- Rap-Dancing into the Third Millennium (1994) (Cassette) (Re-issued on CD as The Quintessential Hallucinogen) ACE
- Packing For the Long Strange Trip (1994) (Audio Cassette) ACE
- Global Perspectives and Psychedelic Poetics (1994) (Cassette) Sound Horizons Audio-Video, Inc.
- The Search for the Original Tree of Knowledge (1992) (Cassette) Sounds True
- The Psychedelic Society (DVD & Video Cassette) Sound Photosynthesis
- True Hallucinations Workshop (Audio/Video Cassette) Sound Photosynthesis
- The Vertigo at History's Edge: Who Are We? Where Have We Come From? Where Are We Going? (DVD & Video/Audio Cassette) Sound Photosynthesis
- Ethnobotany and Shamanism (DVD & Video/Audio Cassette) Sound Photosynthesis
- Shamanism, Symbiosis and Psychedelics Workshop (Audio/Video Cassette) Sound Photosynthesis
- Shamanology (Audio Cassette) Sound Photosynthesis
- Shamanology of the Amazon (w/ Nicole Maxwell) (Audio/Video Cassette) Sound Photosynthesis
- Beyond Psychology (1983) (Audio Cassette) Sound Photosynthesis
- Understanding & the Imagination in the Light of Nature Parts 1 & 2 (DVD & Video/Audio Cassette) Sound Photosynthesis
- Ethnobotany (a complete course given at The California Institute of Integral Studies) (Audio Cassette) Sound Photosynthesis
- Non-ordinary States of Reality Through Vision Plants (Audio Cassette) Sound Photosynthesis
- Mind & Time, Spirit & Matter: The Complete Weekend in Santa Fe (Audio/Video Cassette) Sound Photosynthesis
- Forms and Mysteries: Morphogenetic Fields and Psychedelic Experiences (w/ Rupert Sheldrake) (DVD & Video/Audio Cassette) Sound Photosynthesis
- UFO: The Inside Outsider (DVD & Video/Audio Cassette) Sound Photosynthesis
- A Calendar for The Goddess (DVD & Video/Audio Cassette) Sound Photosynthesis
- A Magical Journey: Including Hallucinogens and Culture, Time and The I Ching, and The Human Future (Video Cassette) TAP/Sound Photosynthesis
- Aliens and Archetypes (Video Cassette) TAP/Sound Photosynthesis
- Angels, Aliens and Archetypes 1987 Symposium: Shamanic Approaches to the UFO, and Fairmont Banquet Talk (DVD & Video/Audio Cassette) Sound Photosynthesis
- Botanical Dimensions (Audio Cassette) Sound Photosynthesis
- Conference on Botanical Intelligence (w/ Joan Halifax, Andy Weil, & Dennis McKenna) (Audio Cassette) Sound Photosynthesis
- Coping With Gaia's Midwife Crisis (Audio Cassette) Sound Photosynthesis
- Dreaming Awake at the End of Time (DVD & Video/Audio Cassette) Sound Photosynthesis
- Evolving Times (DVD, CD & Video/Audio Cassette) Sound Photosynthesis
- Food of the Gods (Audio/Video Cassette) Sound Photosynthesis
- Food of the Gods 2: Drugs, Plants and Destiny (Video Cassette) Sound Photosynthesis
- Hallucinogens in Shamanism & Anthropology at Bridge Psychedelic Conf.1991 (w/ Ralph Metzner, Marlene Dobkin De Rios, Allison Kennedy & Thomas Pinkson) (Audio Cassette) Sound Photosynthesis
- Finale – Bridge Psychedelic Conf.1991 (Audio/Video Cassette) Sound Photosynthesis
- Man and Woman at the End of History (w/ Riane Eisler) (Audio Cassette) Sound Photosynthesis
- Plants, Consciousness, and Transformation (1995) (Audio Cassette) Sound Photosynthesis
- Metamorphosis (w/ Rupert Sheldrake & Ralph Abraham) (1995) (Video Cassette) Mystic Fire/Sound Photosynthesis
- Nature is the Center of the Mandala (Audio Cassette) Sound Photosynthesis
- Opening the Doors of Creativity (1990) (DVD & Video/Audio Cassette) Sound Photosynthesis
- Places I Have Been (CD & Audio Cassette) Sound Photosynthesis
- Plants, Visions and History Lecture (Audio/Video Cassette) Sound Photosynthesis
- Psychedelics Before and After History (DVD & Video/Audio Cassette) Sound Photosynthesis
- Sacred Plants As Guides: New Dimensions of the Soul (at the Jung Society Clairemont, California) (DVD & Video/Audio Cassette) Sound Photosynthesis
- Seeking the Stone (Video Cassette) Sound Photosynthesis
- Shamanism: Before and Beyond History – A Weekend at Ojai (w/ Ralph Metzner) (Audio/Video Cassette) Sound Photosynthesis
- Shedding the Monkey (Audio Cassette) Sound Photosynthesis
- State of the Stone '95 (Audio Cassette) Sound Photosynthesis
- The Ethnobotany of Shamanism Introductory Lecture: The Philosophical Implications of Psychobotony: Past, Present and Future (at CIIS) (Audio/Video Cassette) Sound Photosynthesis
- The Ethnobotany of Shamanism Workshop: Psychedelics Before and After History (at CIIS) (Audio Cassette) Sound Photosynthesis
- The Grammar of Ecstasy – the World Within the Word (Audio Cassette) Sound Photosynthesis
- The Light at the End of History (Audio/Video Cassette) Sound Photosynthesis
- The State of the Stone Address: Having Archaic and Eating it Too (Audio Cassette) Sound Photosynthesis
- The Taxonomy of Illusion (at UC Santa Cruz) (DVD & Video/Audio Cassette) Sound Photosynthesis
- This World ...and Its Double (DVD & Video/Audio Cassette) Sound Photosynthesis
- Trialogues at the Edge of the Millennium (w/ Rupert Sheldrake & Ralph Abraham) (at UC Santa Cruz) (1998) (Video Cassette) Trialogue Press

=== Discography ===
- Re : Evolution with The Shamen (1992)
- Dream Matrix Telemetry with Zuvuya (1993)
- Alien Dreamtime with Spacetime Continuum & Stephen Kent (2003)
- "Reclaim Your Mind" with Mark Pontius (2020)

=== Filmography ===
- Experiment at Petaluma (1990)
- Prague Gnosis: Terence McKenna Dialogues (1992)
- The Hemp Revolution (1995)
- Terence McKenna: The Last Word (1999)
- Shamans of the Amazon (2001)
- Alien Dreamtime (2003)
- 2012: The Odyssey (2007)
- The Alchemical Dream: Rebirth of the Great Work (2008)
- Manifesting the Mind (2009)
- Cognition Factor (2009)
- DMT: The Spirit Molecule (2010)
- 2012: Time for Change (2010)
- The Terence McKenna OmniBus (2012)
- The Transcendental Object at the End of Time (2014)
- Terence McKenna's True Hallucinations (2016)

== See also ==
- Benny Shanon
- David E. Nichols
- Jeremy Narby
- Jonathan Ott
- Luis Eduardo Luna
- Omega Point
- Rick Strassman
- Christian Rätsch
