= Timothy Ely =

- Born: Timothy C. Ely; 1949 (age 76–77); Snohomish, Washington
- Known for: Painter, Graphic Designer, Bookbinder.
- Awards: National Endowment for the Arts Fellowship, Pollock-Krasner Foundation Grant, Art Matters, Inc. Grant

Timothy C. Ely (born February 9, 1949) is a contemporary American painter, graphic artist, and bookbinder, known for creating single-copy handmade books as art objects.

Ely was born in Snohomish, Washington in 1949. Following graduate school (University of Washington, MFA 1975), Ely undertook a self-directed study of bookbinding and began to create his first work.

With a National Endowment for the Arts Fellowship (1981) Ely traveled to Japan and England to study bookbinding and paper making. He eventually moved his studio to Portland, Oregon, back to his native Pacific Northwest. His works are highly valued and feature in public and private collections, including those at Princeton, Yale, and University of Texas, Austin.

Ely has also collaborated with the writers David Abel (Memo 7 and Other Works, 1989) and Terence McKenna (Synesthesia, 1992), who also wrote the introduction to the 1995 trade publication of Ely's 1985 book Flight Into Egypt. Ely has also illustrated a small number of conventional or commercial projects. He currently lives in Colfax, Washington.

== Style ==
Yale art historian Johanna Drucker discusses Ely's work in her chapter titled "The Book as a Rare and/or Auratic Object" where she observes Ely's works "suggest a world in which the book is an artifact of wisdom,… secret and precious, available to the initiate rather than the casual or widespread reader".

Much of Ely’s work is annotated with his own glyphs he calls “cribriform.” In an interview with Pamela Train Leutz, Ely said he was "intrigued with the idea of concealment" after learning how to hide doodles from his elementary school teacher.

Roy Harley Lewis described Ely as a bookbinder in the "total book" tradition, constructing not only the paper and the binding of the book but the art that it contains. Ely's books serve as a "looking-at machine" for his fantastical drawings, and they frequently feature maps and diagrams that invite the reader to investigate hidden meaning.

Ely has developed a distinctive method that he calls "Drumleaf binding", which allows his drawing to extend into the gutter without being damaged.

== Selected Works ==
- Silences and Distances (1983)
- The Flight Into Egypt (1985)
- Approach to the Site (1986)
- Borderline (1989)
- Turning to Face (1989, with Daniel E. Kelm)
- Synesthesia (1992)
- Saturnia (1995)
