= Klea McKenna =

American photographer

- Born: 1980 (age 45–46); Freestone, California
- Children: 2
- Website: https://www.kleamckenna.com/

Klea McKenna (born 1980) is an American visual artist based in San Francisco, California. She is known for her camera-less photography, photograms and inventive techniques using light sensitive material. Her work is included in the collections of the San Francisco Museum of Modern Art, the Los Angeles County Museum of Art, the San Francisco airport, and the Victoria & Albert Museum, London. Her father was ethnobotanist and writer, Terence McKenna.

== Early life ==
Mckenna’s parents, Terence McKenna and Kathleen McKenna, were both, in her words, “ethnobotanists of sorts,” interested in the natural world. In her early years, McKenna lived off the grid with her parents and her brother Finn on the Big Island of Hawaii, where her parents ran their non-profit Botanical Dimensions in Honaunau. Her mother and brother also made art, and while early on she found herself more interested in expressing herself through dance and imagining herself a city person, she ultimately found her way back to nature through abstraction in photography and visual art as a teenager. Her childhood on the volcanic slopes of Hawaii has influenced her artistic work, consisting of photographs and photograms inspired by and often made from the natural world.

== Series ==
=== Generation (2018) ===
McKenna's body of work "Generation," was exhibited in 2018 both at Gitterman Gallery in New York, New York, and at Von Lintel Gallery in Los Angeles, California. The works were again exhibited in the show "Shift" at EUQINOM Gallery, in San Francisco, California. For the series, McKenna used a printing press to imprint the texture of vintage textiles from the 1890s to the 1960s, representing women's global fashion history onto silver gelatin paper before exposing the embossed surface to raking light, creating a textural photogram. The textiles included Uzbek suzani, Chinese silk, and an Afghan niqab. One work exhibited at the EUQINOM show was Underground (1), 2019, copper, sepia, and selenium toned photogram and relief on gelatin silver fiber paper, 24 x 20".

Her 2018 artist's book Generation, which accompanied the first two exhibitions of the works, includes images of some of the works along with McKenna's written reflections on "the material history and intimate use of the textile," according to LA Times art critic Leah Ollman. Each book's cover, made from the residue of the works themselves, boasts a unique texture, inviting those holding the book to tangibly feel the art.

=== Automatic Earth (2016) ===
For her "Automatic Earth" series, exhibited in 2016 at Von Lintel Gallery in Los Angeles, California, McKenna created rubbings of tree stumps using photographic paper in the darkness of night and then exposed them using a flashlight in a dark room. The results are photograms that depict the annual growth rings of the trees. Two collaged rubbings of a 47-year-old cedar tree make up one work from the series, entitled Born in 1969 (1).

The series, along with four other bodies of work each exploring the interconnectedness of humans and the natural world, are highlighted in the artist's 2023 book Witness Mark.

=== No Light Unbroken (2014) ===
In 2014, McKenna exhibited her "No Light Unbroken" series at Von Lintel Gallery in Los Angeles, California. The series of photograms uses the recurring subjects of rain, spiders, and banana trees to replicate the feeling of standing in a rainstorm on a completely dark night.
