= Bitterness =

Basic taste

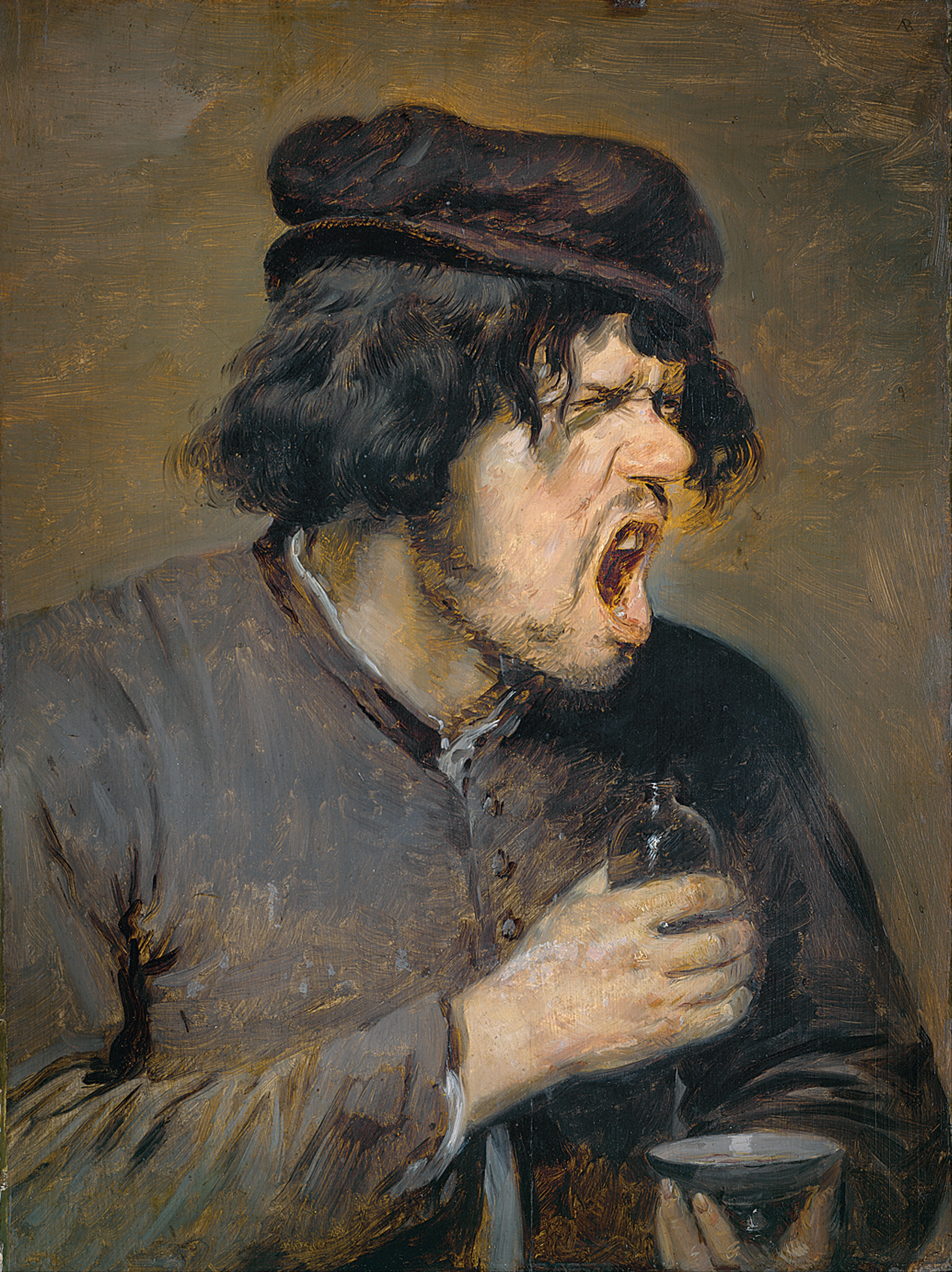
The Bitter Draught by Adriaen Brouwer.

Bitterness, also known as bitter, is one of the most sensitive of tastes, and many experience it as unpleasant, sharp, or off-putting, but it is sometimes desirable and intentionally added via various bittering agents. Common bitter foods and drinks include coffee, unsweetened cocoa, South American mate, coca tea, Momordica charantia, unripe olives, citrus peel, some varieties of cheese, many plants in the Brassicaceae family, Taraxacum greens, Marrubium vulgare, wild chicory, and escarole. The ethanol in alcoholic beverages tastes bitter, as do the additional bittering ingredients found in some alcoholic beverages, including hops in beer and gentian in bitters. Quinine is also known for its bitter taste and is found in tonic water.

Bitterness is of interest to those studying evolution, as well as to various health researchers as a large number of naturally-occurring bitter compounds are known to be toxic. The ability to detect bitter-tasting, toxic compounds at low thresholds is thought to serve an important protective function. Plant leaves often contain toxic compounds, and among leaf-eating primates there is a tendency to prefer immature leaves, which tend to be higher in protein and lower in fiber and toxins than mature leaves. Among humans, various food processing techniques are used worldwide to detoxify otherwise inedible foods and make them palatable. The use of fire, changes in diet, and avoidance of toxins has allowed for several loss-of-function mutations that have resulted in a reduced sensory capacity for bitterness in humans compared to other species.

== See also ==
- Bitter taste evolution
