= Drunken monkey hypothesis =

Hypothesis on human attraction to alcohol

The drunken monkey hypothesis proposes that human attraction to alcohol may derive from dependence of the primate ancestors of Homo sapiens on ripe and fermenting fruit as a dominant food source. Ethanol naturally occurs in ripe and overripe fruit when yeasts ferment sugars, and consequently early primates (and many other fruit-eating animals) have evolved a genetically based behavioral attraction to the molecule.

This hypothesis was originally proposed by Robert Dudley of the University of California at Berkeley, and was the subject of a symposium at the 2004 annual meeting of the Society for Integrative and Comparative Biology. His book The Drunken Monkey: Why We Drink and Abuse Alcohol was published in 2014 by the University of California Press. Dudley suggests that, whereas most addictive substances have a relatively short history of human use, attraction to and consumption of ethanol by various primates may go back tens of millions of years. The odors of ripening fruit would help primates find scarce calories in tropical rain forests, given that ethanol is a relatively light molecule and is moved rapidly by winds through vegetation. This once-beneficial attraction to and consumption of ethanol at low concentrations may underlie modern human tendencies for alcohol use and alcohol abuse.

== See also ==
- Evolutionary models of human drug use
- Long-term impact of alcohol on the brain
- Stoned ape theory
