= Bitter taste evolution =

Evolution of bitter taste receptors

The sensation of bitterness evolved in the common ancestor of jawed vertebrates: the bitter taste receptor gene family TAS2R is limited to jaw vertebrates, a group that originated about 500 million years ago. The TAS2R gene cluster in tetrapods is massive compared to those in fishes, with great variation from species to species indicating a rich history of evolution. In tetrapods, TAS2R detect toxins, mostly of a plant origin, as a bitter taste. Expansion of the gene cluster via gene duplication allows variants to arise, potentially leading to the detection of more types of toxins. As a result, TAS2R expansion usually coincides with changes in a species' diet.

The TAS2R cluster has been well characterized in humans and several common laboratory animals such as primates and mice. In humans, the family contains 25 functional loci as well as 11 pseudogenes. The current human genetic diversity in this cluster indicates ongoing evolution. It also tells a story about changes in hominid diets with a shift to foods that are less likely to contain bitter toxins.

== Background ==
=== TAS2R ===
The bitter taste receptor family, T2R (TAS2R), is encoded on chromosome 7 and chromosome 12. Genes on the same chromosome have shown remarkable similarity with each other, suggesting that the primary mutagenic forces in evolution of TAS2R are duplication events. These events have occurred in at least seven primate species: chimpanzee, human, gorilla, orangutan, rhesus macaque and baboon. The high variety among primate and rodent populations additionally suggests that, while selective constraint on these genes certainly exists, its effect is rather slight.

Members of the T2R family encode alpha subunits of G-protein-coupled receptors, which are involved in intracellular taste transduction, not only on the taste buds but also in the pancreas and gastrointestinal tract. The mechanism of transduction is shown by exposure of the endocrine and gastrointestinal cells containing the receptors to bitter compounds, most famously phenylthiocarbamide (PTC). Exposure to PTC causes an intracellular cascade as evidenced by a large and rapid increase in intracellular calcium ions.

== Selective forces ==
=== Toxins as the primary selective force ===
The primary selective adaptation that arises from bitter taste is to detect poisonous compounds, as most poisonous compounds in nature are bitter. However, this trait is not always advantageous, as bitter compounds exist in nature that are not poisonous. Exclusive rejection of these compounds would in fact be a disadvantageous trait, as it would make it more difficult to find food. Toxic and bitter compounds do, however, exist in different diets at different frequencies. Sensitivities to bitter compounds should follow the requirements of different diets logically, as species that can afford to reject plants due to their low plant diet (carnivores) have a higher sensitivity to bitter compounds than those that exclusively ingest plants. Exposure to the bitter marker quinine hydrochloride supported this fact, as the sensitivities to bitter compounds were highest in carnivores, followed by omnivores, then grazers and browsers. This identifies toxic plants as the primary selective force for bitter taste.

This phenomenon is confirmed with genetic analysis. One measure of positive selection is K_{a}/K_{s}, the ratio of synonymous to non-synonymous mutations. If the rate of synonymous mutation is higher than the rate of non-synonymous mutation, then the trait created by the non-synonymous mutation is being selected for relative to the neutral synonymous mutations. For the bitter taste gene family, TAS2R, this ratio is over one in the loci responsible for the extracellular binding domains of the receptors. This indicates that the part of the receptor responsible for binding the bitter ligands is under positive selective pressure.

=== Neutral evolution ===
Neutral evolution also shapes the bitter taste receptors, especially during times of relaxed selective constraint. Adaptive vs. neutral evolution can be distinguished using synonymous vs. non-synonymous mutation ratios. Among modern humans, neutral evolution is taking place.

== Specific organisms ==
=== Primates in general ===
A pan-primate survey found that there have been many changes in the size of the TAS2R cluster throughout primate evolution, most of which can be correlated with dietary changes. The Cercopithecidae, which feeds on a lot of plants, have an especially high amount of duplication events.

=== Bats ===
A survey of bitter taste receptors in bats found that the genus Myotis sees not only significant expansion of the gene cluster, but also evidence of molecular adaptation across the many species of this genus. The number of copies would have increased the bat's ability to detect toxins that may occur in their insect prey such as arbutin and salicin. Further specialization of copies may have expanded the spectrum of toxins each species can detect, which is important for a genus that occupies diverse habitats.

=== Humans ===
==== TAS2R16 ====
The gene locus, TAS2R16, also tells a story about bitter taste evolution. Varying rates of positive selection in different areas of the world give an indication of the selective pressures and events in those areas. At this locus, the 172Asn allele is the most common, especially in areas of Eurasia and in pygmy tribes in Africa, where it is nearly fixed. This suggests that the gene has had a relaxed selective constraint in most areas of Africa in comparison to Eurasia. This has been attributed to the increased knowledge of toxic plants in the area that arose around 10,000 years ago. The increased frequency of 172Asn in Eurasia suggests that the migration out of Africa into areas with different climates and foliage rendered the knowledge of toxic plants in Africa useless, forcing the populations to rely once again on the 172Asn allele, causing higher rates of positive selection. The high rate of 172Asn in Pygmy populations is more difficult to explain. The effective population size of these isolated populations is quite small, indicating that genetic drift explained by the founder effect is the cause of these atypically high rates. The different environments that have contained humans have placed different levels of selection on the population, forcing a wide variety in at the TAS2R loci across humanity.

==== Pseudogenes ====
The pseudogenes mentioned earlier are produced by a number of gene silencing events, the rate of which is constant throughout primate species. Several of these pseudogenes maintain a role in modulating taste response, however. By studying the silencing events in humans, it is possible to theorize the selective pressures on humans throughout their evolutionary history. As is the case with the usual distribution of human genetic variation, the highest rate of diversity in TAS2R pseudogenes was often found in African populations. This was not the case with two pseudogene loci: TAS2R6P and TAS2R18P, where the highest diversity was found in non-African populations. This suggests that the functional versions of these genes arose before the human migration out of Africa into an area where selective constraint did not remove non-functional versions of these gene loci. This allowed the pseudogene frequency to increase, creating genetic variance at those loci. This is an example of relaxed environmental constraint allowing silencing mutations to lead to pseudogenization of once important loci.

==== Relaxed constraint ====
Neutral evolution in the bitter taste trait in humans is well documented by evolutionary biologists. In all human populations there have been high rates of synonymous and non-synonymous substitutions that cause pseudogenization. These events cause alleles that are present to this day because of relaxed selective constraint by the environment. The genes under neutral evolution in humans are very similar to several genes in chimpanzees in both their synonymous and non-synonymous mutation rates, suggesting that relaxed selective constraint started before the divergence of the two species.

The cause of this relaxed constraint was primarily in lifestyle changes in hominids. Roughly two million years ago, the hominid diet shifted from a primarily vegetarian diet to an increasingly meat-based diet. This led to a reduction in the amount of toxic foods regularly encountered by humanity's early ancestors. Additionally, the use of fire began around 800,000 years ago, which further detoxified food and led to a decreased dependence on TAS2R to detect poisonous food. Evolutionary biologists have theorized how, with fire being an exclusively human tool, relaxed selective constraint has been found in chimpanzees as well. Meat does account for about 15% of the chimpanzee diet, with much of the other 85% being made up of ripe fruits, which very rarely contains toxins. This comes in contrast to other primates whose diets are entirely composed of leaves, unripe fruits, and bark, which have comparatively high levels of toxins. The differences in diets between chimpanzees and other primates account for the different levels of selective constraint.

=== Non-tetrapods ===
Bitter-taste genes are present in most jawed vertebrates, but not in jawless vertebrates. This gene family is present in 0 or 1 copy in most cartilaginous fish, in a few more copies in non-tetrapod bony fish (7 copies in zebrafish), and dozens of copies in most tetrapods (reptiles, amphibians, birds, mammals, etc.). This pattern indicates an origin of the aversive sensation of bitterness in the common ancestor of jawed vertebrates. The tetrapod explosion in copy number would have enabled the ability to detect new types of molecules, a reasonable need considering the many different types of plant toxins on land.
