= Roland L. Fischer =

Hungarian researcher (1915–1997)

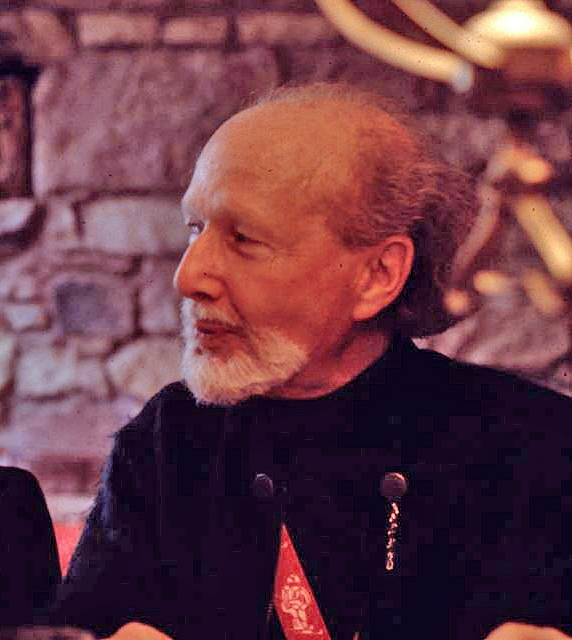
- Fischer during a visit to the Swiss city of Basel, November 1981
- Born: 1915; Budapest, Austria-Hungary
- Died: 1997 (aged 81–82); Majorca, Spain
- Education: University of Basel
- Scientific career
- Fields: Psychopharmacology and Pharmacology
- Workplaces: Ohio State University (1958-1971), George Washington University, Georgetown University, Johns Hopkins University

Roland Fischer (1915–1997) was an experimental researcher and psychopharmacologist known for his early work on psychedelic drugs, schizophrenia, the perception-hallucination continuum model of altered states of consciousness, and for his work on gustation which later contributed to research supporting supertasting. Fischer was formerly professor of experimental psychiatry and associate professor of pharmacology at Ohio State University (1958-1971), and also held academic posts at George Washington University, Georgetown and Johns Hopkins University.

== Life and career ==
Roland Fischer was born in Budapest in 1915. Six months before the start of World War II in 1939, Roland Fischer left Hungary to study chemistry at the University of Basel in Switzerland, where he received his Ph.D. in 1945.

Fischer was active between 1951 and 1977 and was the author of more than 350 publications.

In the 1970s, Fischer was a lecturer in pharmacology at the George Washington University Medical School and the Johns Hopkins Medical School and an editor for the Journal of Altered States of Consciousness. At this time, his interests involved biofeedback and EEG research on different states of consciousness.

In 1977, he retired to the island of Majorca where he died in 1997. In gratitude for the opportunities for engaging in teaching and research offered in his late days by the University of the Balearic Islands, he donated his personal collection of books to the library of the University of the Balearic Islands.

== Model psychosis hypothesis ==
Like German chemist Kurt Beringer (1893-1949) before him, Roland Fischer began looking for an explanatory model of psychosis for schizophrenia in the late 1940s by comparing it to altered states produced by hallucinogens. In the 1950s, Roland Fischer was quoted by Humphry Osmond in 1956 for having previously studied schizophrenia as a research biochemist. Fischer explored the model psychosis hypothesis of altered drug states originally studied by Beringer in 1927. Fischer and other researchers wondered if LSD could act as a chemical model for schizophrenia. However, as biochemical research progressed over time, the theory was rejected as newer evidence showed that both substance-induced psychosis and organic psychosis are remarkably different.

== Taste science ==
In the 1960s, he helped contribute to research on gustation and is credited with discovering the association between the ability to taste PROP (6-n-propylthiouracil) with food preferences and body weight, and its relationship to alcohol use and smoking. His early work in taste science contributed to later research on supertasting.

== Perception-hallucination continuum ==
Between 1968 and the late 1980s, Roland Fischer developed a model for altered states of consciousness in several stages known as the perception-hallucination continuum. On one end of the continuum were ecstatic states, such as mystical rapture, separated by hyperarousal and hallucinatory states that schizophrenics might experience, followed by an aroused state, such as during creativity. Normal consciousness resides in the middle of the continuum. On the other end the hyperarousal states, such as those experienced during samadhi, separated by tranquil states, for example during Zen meditation.

== Selected works ==
- Fischer, R. L. (1966), The Realities of Hallucinogenic Drugs: A Compendium. Criminology 4: 2–15. doi:10.1111/j.1745-9125.1966.tb00153.x
- Fischer, R. (1971, November 26). A Cartography of the Ecstatic and Meditative States. Science. 174 (4012), 897-904.
- Fischer, R. (1971). Gustatory, behavioral, and pharmacological manifestations of chemoreception in man. In Ohloff, G. and Thomas, A.F. (Ed.), Gustation and Olfaction. New York: Academic Press. pp. 187–237. ISBN 0125249500.
- Fischer, R. (1992). A Cartography of Cognitive and Non-Cognitive States of Consciousness. Anthropology of Consciousness 3: 3–13. doi:10.1525/ac.1992.3.3-4.3
