= Rebiana =

Trade name for rebaudioside A

Rebiana is the trade name for high-purity rebaudioside A, a steviol glycoside that is 200 times as sweet as sugar. It is derived from stevia leaves by steeping them in water and purifying the resultant extract to obtain the rebaudioside A. The Coca-Cola Company filed patents on rebiana, and in 2007 it licensed the rights to the patents for food products to Cargill; Coca-Cola retained the exclusive rights to use the patents for beverage products. Truvia and PureVia are each made from rebiana and were each recognized as GRAS food ingredients by the US FDA in 2008.
