= Blue California =

Ingredient manufacturer

Blue California Company
- Type: Privately Held
- Industry: Dietary ingredients food and beverage
- Founded: Orange County, California, California, United States (1994)
- Headquarters: Rancho Santa Margarita, California, USA
- Key people: Steven Chen, CEO num_employees = 25 (USA) 175+(Asia)
- Products: Botanical extracts

Blue California is a Southern California, United States-based nature-based ingredient manufacturer of botanical extracts and specialty ingredients produced via fermentation through a proprietary bioconversion process.

Blue California's facility produces non-irradiated ingredients through steam and ozone sterilization. There are more than 550 Kosher-certified ingredients in the product line.

== Ingredients ==
- Vita Panax

== Notes and references ==
- "Blue California To Offer Rebaudioside A, a Purified Stevia Compound. November 13, 2007." https://web.archive.org/web/20080217211612/http://bluecal-ingredients.com/whatsnew/pr_20071113.php
- "US firm claims cheap, industrial stevia production. November 15, 2007." http://www.foodnavigator-usa.com/news/ng.asp?n=81404-blue-california-stevia-sweetener
- "Phytosterols Out of the Blue. October 10, 2004." https://web.archive.org/web/20080222060600/http://www.foodprocessing.com/vendors/products/2007/021.html
- "Food Technology & Innovation 2008 Sponsors" https://web.archive.org/web/20080101193151/http://www.foodinnovatena.com/suppliers_conf.asp
