= Sweet and Low (poem) =

"Sweet and Low" is a poem by Alfred, Lord Tennyson. Written in 1849, Tennyson sent two versions of the poem to Emily Sellwood in November, asking her to select which one to include in the revised 1850 edition of The Princess, where it intercalates canto II and III.

Charles Kingsley in a review in Fraser's Magazine (September 1850) found the poem so exquisite that he quoted it in full, and it became, as did the other five "songs" inserted in 1850 edition of The Princess, a poem widely translated in Europe.

== Text ==
Sweet and low, sweet and low,
Wind of the western sea,
Low, low, breathe and blow,
Wind of the western sea!
Over the rolling waters go,
Come from the dying moon, and blow,
Blow him again to me;
While my little one, while my pretty one, sleeps.

Sleep and rest, sleep and rest,
Father will come to thee soon;
Rest, rest, on mother's breast,
Father will come to thee soon;
Father will come to his babe in the nest,
Silver sails all out of the west,
Under the silver moon:
Sleep, my little one, sleep, my pretty one, sleep.

== In popular culture ==
Joseph Barnby set the poem as a partsong in 1865.

The title has been reused used many times, notably by Benjamin Eisenstadt in 1957 for his artificial sweetener brand Sweet'n Low. Mary Higgins Clark's 1989 novel While My Pretty One Sleeps takes its title from the first stanza.

In the first issue of the comic Open Your Eyes by Levi Nunnink, part of the poem is included over an image on the final page.

== See also ==
- Sweet and Low (disambiguation), for other articles with this title
