= PureVia =

Stevia-based sugar substitute

PureVia is a stevia-based low calorie sugar substitute developed jointly by PepsiCo and Whole Earth Sweetener Company which is a wholly owned subsidiary of artificial sweetener manufacturing company Merisant.

It is currently distributed and marketed by Whole Earth Sweetener Company as a tabletop sweetener and as a food ingredient. PureVia competes against Coca-Cola and Cargill's jointly developed Truvia brand of stevia-extract sweetener and Cumberland Packing Corporation's 'Stevia in the Raw' stevia-extract sweetener.

== Ingredients and Safety ==
PureVia is a blend of several different ingredients. It contains dextrose, natural flavors as well as the stevia extract rebaudioside A.

The Food and Drug Administration (FDA) determined in December 2008 that rebaudioside A is safe for inclusion as a food additive.

== Food ingredient ==
PureVia is used as a sweetener in SoBe Lifewater which is manufactured by PepsiCo. It is also used in Trop50 and Gatorade G2.
