= PureCircle =

American producer of stevia sweeteners

PureCircle Ltd
- Industry: Food and beverage
- Founded: 2001
- Headquarters: Chicago, Illinois
- Key people: John Slosar (Chairman); Nate Yates (CEO)
- Products: Sweeteners
- Revenue: $131.1 million (2018)
- Operating income: $24.4 million (2018)
- Net income: $8.7 million (2018)
- Website: http://www.purecircle.com

PureCircle is a producer and innovator in the area of stevia sweeteners for the food and beverage industry. PureCircle has offices around the world, with the headquarters in Chicago, Illinois. It was listed on the London Stock Exchange until it was acquired by Ingredion in July 2020.

== History ==
PureCircle was founded in 2001 and incorporated into PureCircle Ltd. in 2007. From its inception the company has created and continues to operate a vertically integrated supply chain for high-purity stevia from crop cultivation through extraction, production and final product distribution.

In December 2007, PureCircle made an initial public offering on the Alternative Investment Market (AIM) of the London Stock Exchange to raise US$50M to fund expansion.

Throughout its history, the company has worked with various regulatory bodies in different countries to obtain approval for the use of stevia-based sweeteners in foods and beverages.

In 2012, PureCircle announced a joint development agreement with the Coca-Cola Co. to investigate new forms of stevia and to provide stevia for future beverage products.

In 2013, the company said it would be providing a new high-purity Rebaudioside sweetener (Reb M) for the production of Coca-Cola Life in the United Kingdom, United States and other countries starting in 2014.

The company moved to the main market of the London Stock Exchange in 2015.

In 2016, the U.S. Customs and Border Protection impounded PureCircle products that had been made using prison labour in China. In August 2020, the U.S. Customs and Border Protection fined a subsidiary of PureCircle for use of prison labour in China.

In 2017 the company completed $42 million stevia plant expansion in Enstek, Malaysia, which doubled the company's capacity to extract high-quality, sustainable stevia. The same year PureCircle launched its North Carolina agronomy program which help farmers productively and profitably utilize acreage that once grew tobacco. This program broadens and diversifies the company's supply chain by increasing the amount of stevia grown in different areas around the globe and throughout the year. These farming partnerships have provided innovations for both PureCircle and the farmers. The work in North Carolina has yielded advances for the company's stevia agronomy program, including how to adapt growing stevia plants to different regions of the world. In addition, the mechanization of farming – and advances from this program – are particularly important in North Carolina to maintain a sustainable economic crop.

The company moved its global commercial headquarters to Chicago, Illinois, in 2018.

The company was acquired by Ingredion in July 2020.

PureCircle was ranked 17th on FoodTalks' Top 50 Global Sweetener Companies list in 2021.

In August 2020, the U.S. Customs and Border Protection announced a $575,000 penalty against the company for importing powdered food sweeteners produced by prison labor in China. This marked the first enforcement action under the Trade Facilitation and Trade Enforcement Act of 2015 against goods produced with forced labour. The investigation was prompted by allegations from a non-governmental organization regarding imports from the Inner Mongolia Hengzheng Group Baoanzhao Agricultural and Trade LLC (Baoanzhao), which included at least 20 batches of stevia powder processed by Baoanzhao using prison labour.

== Operations ==
PureCircle is an international producer and marketer of specialty natural ingredients based on high-purity stevia. The company oversees production of stevia in Asia, Africa and the Americas and works with producers to promote the use of sustainable practices at each step of the production and distribution process. PureCircle operates a vertically integrated supply chain, managing its resources from the plant through harvesting, processing and formulation. This focus enables PureCircle to integrate sustainability directly into its business model.

== Recognition and awards ==
PureCircle's achievements have been recognized by the readers of the Financial Times Investors Chronicle who in 2009 voted PureCircle as AIM International Company of the Year. In 2014, PureCircle received the World Dairy Innovation Award for Best Environmental Sustainability Initiative at the 8th World Dairy Congress. PureCircle won the 2014 "Sustainability Commercialized" Award from Ethical Corporation, a global publication dedicated to corporate social responsibility. PureCircle has also been nominated as a finalist for its sustainability effort at Food Ingredients Europe (FiE) 2013 sustainability and World Beverage Innovation awards 2014.
