= Packet (container) =

Small bag or pouch

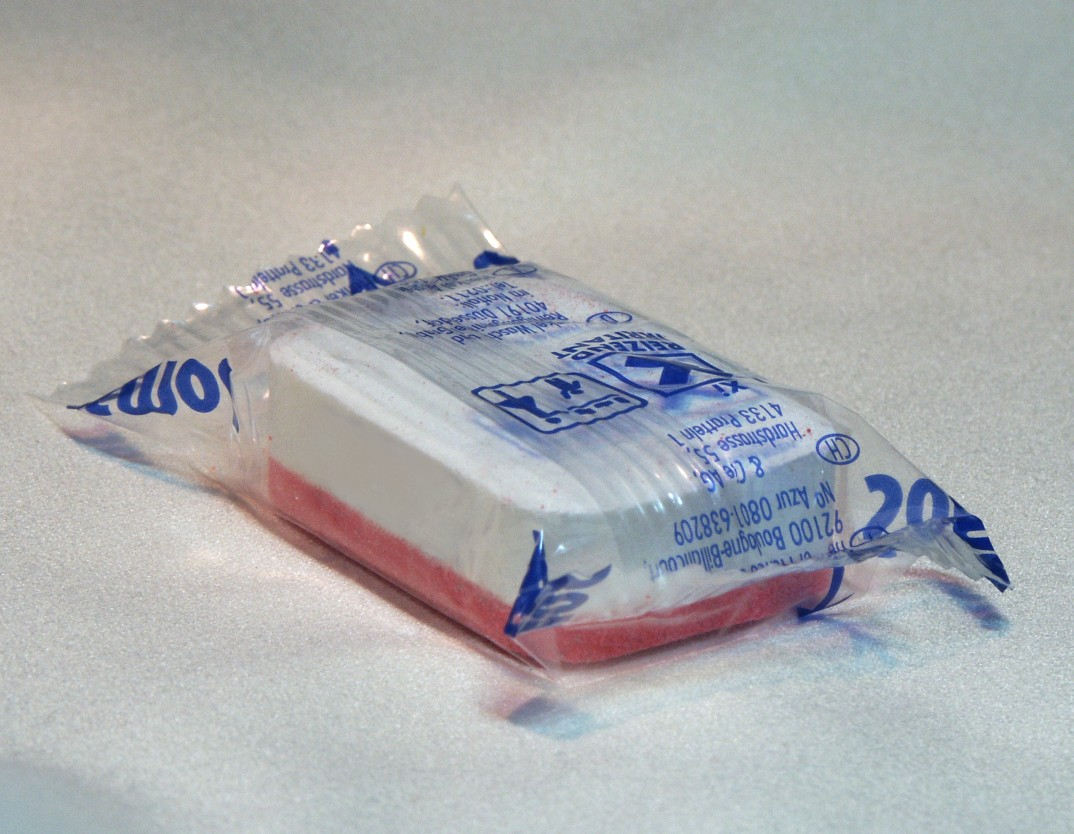
Packet containing a dishwasher tablet

A packet or sachet is a small bag or pouch, made from paper, foil, plastic film or another type of packing material, often used to contain single-use quantities of foods or consumer goods such as ketchup or shampoo. Packets are commonly opened by making a small rip or tear in part of the package, and then squeezing out the contents.

== Uses ==
Condiments distributed in packets include ketchup, mustard, mayonnaise, salad cream, HP sauce, relish, tartar sauce, vinegar and soy sauce. They provide a simple and low-cost way of distributing small amounts of condiment with ready-to-eat packaged food such as hot dogs, French fries, or hamburgers, and are common in fast food restaurants. The packets produce less contamination and mess than freely available condiments dispensed into small disposable cups or other containers, especially if the food will be in transit before dining. Potpourri fragrances are also sold in sachets. Potpourri sachet envelopes are filled with scented herbs and flowers or use vermiculite containing aromatic fragrance oil. These are known as potpourri wardrobe sachets. In Argentina and Uruguay, milk and yogurts are also sold in packets.

In 1983, the Indian company Cavin Kare began selling shampoo in small plastic packets instead of large bottles in order to make it more affordable to the poor. Sale of small amounts of shampoo and detergents in plastic packets is very popular throughout the Philippines, India and other Eastern countries. In 2011, 87% of shampoo sold in India was in sachets.

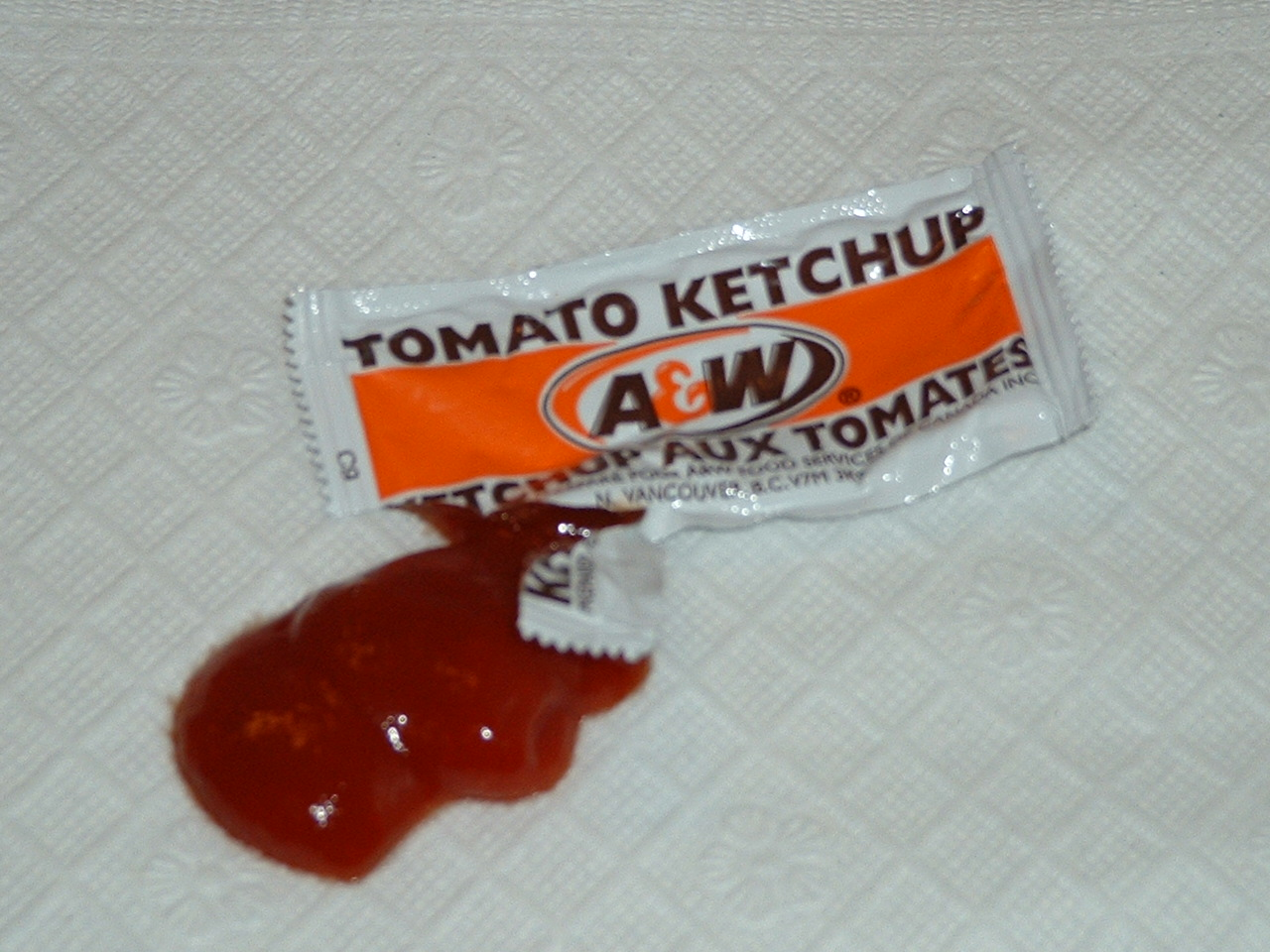
A packet of ketchup, opened with the contents squeezed out

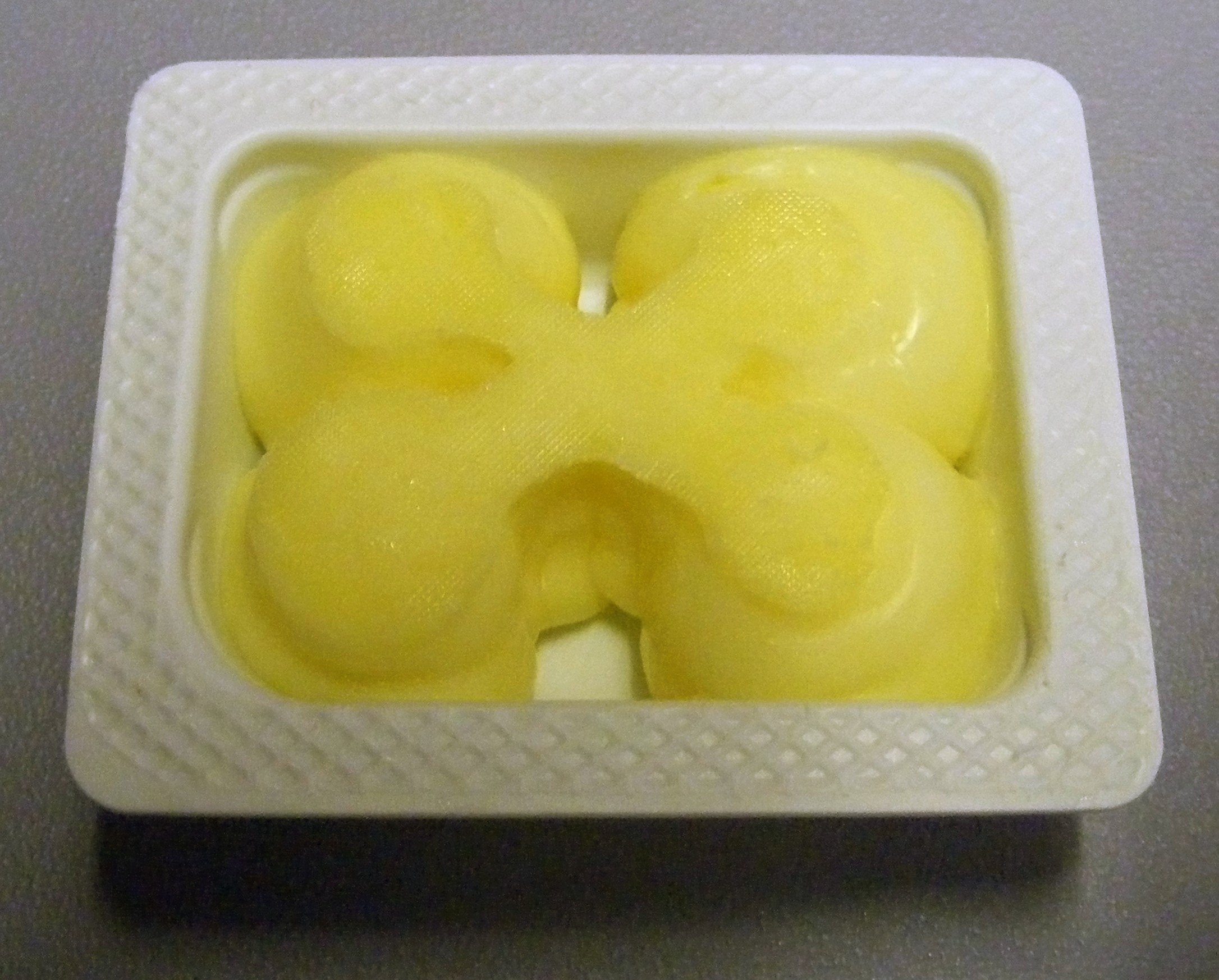
A packet of butter

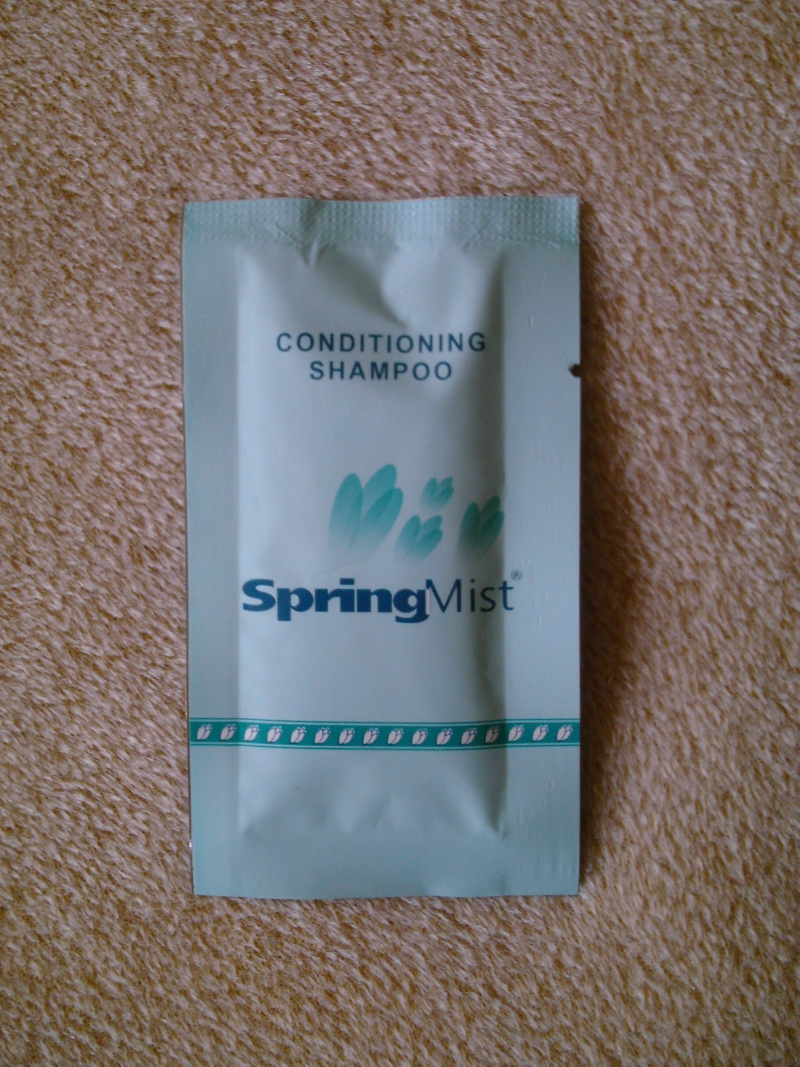
Shampoo packet

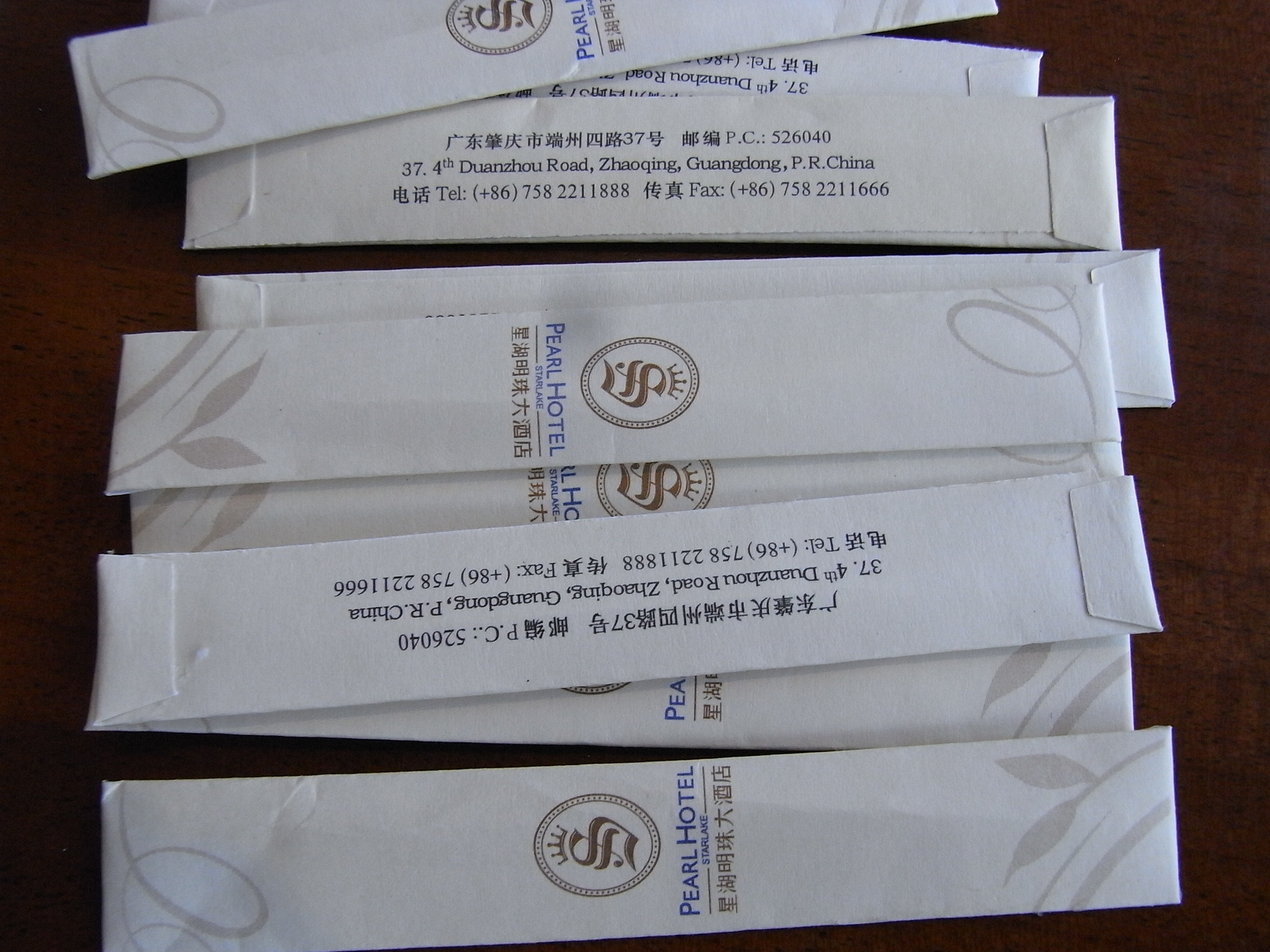
Paper toothpick packets

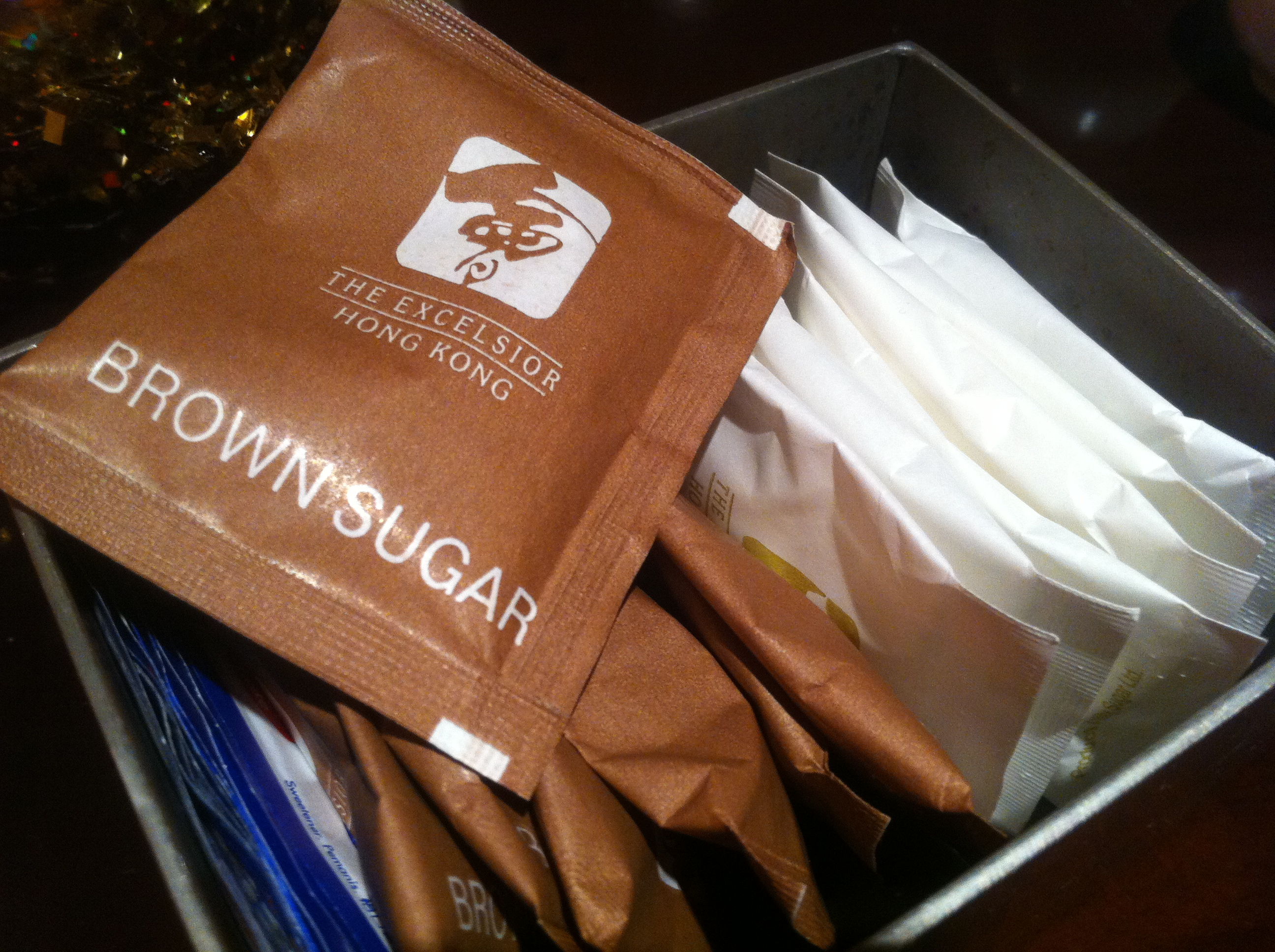
Paper sugar packets

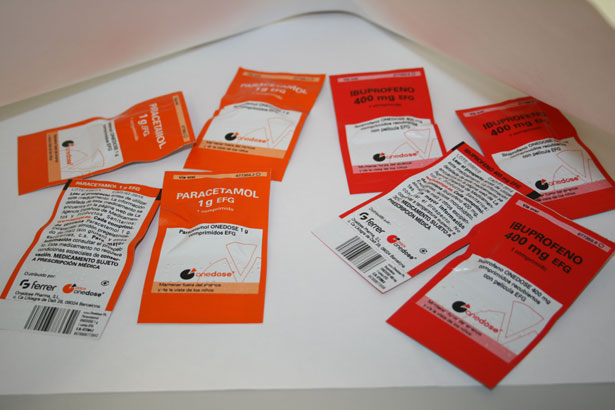
Pharmaceutical packets with text and bar code identification

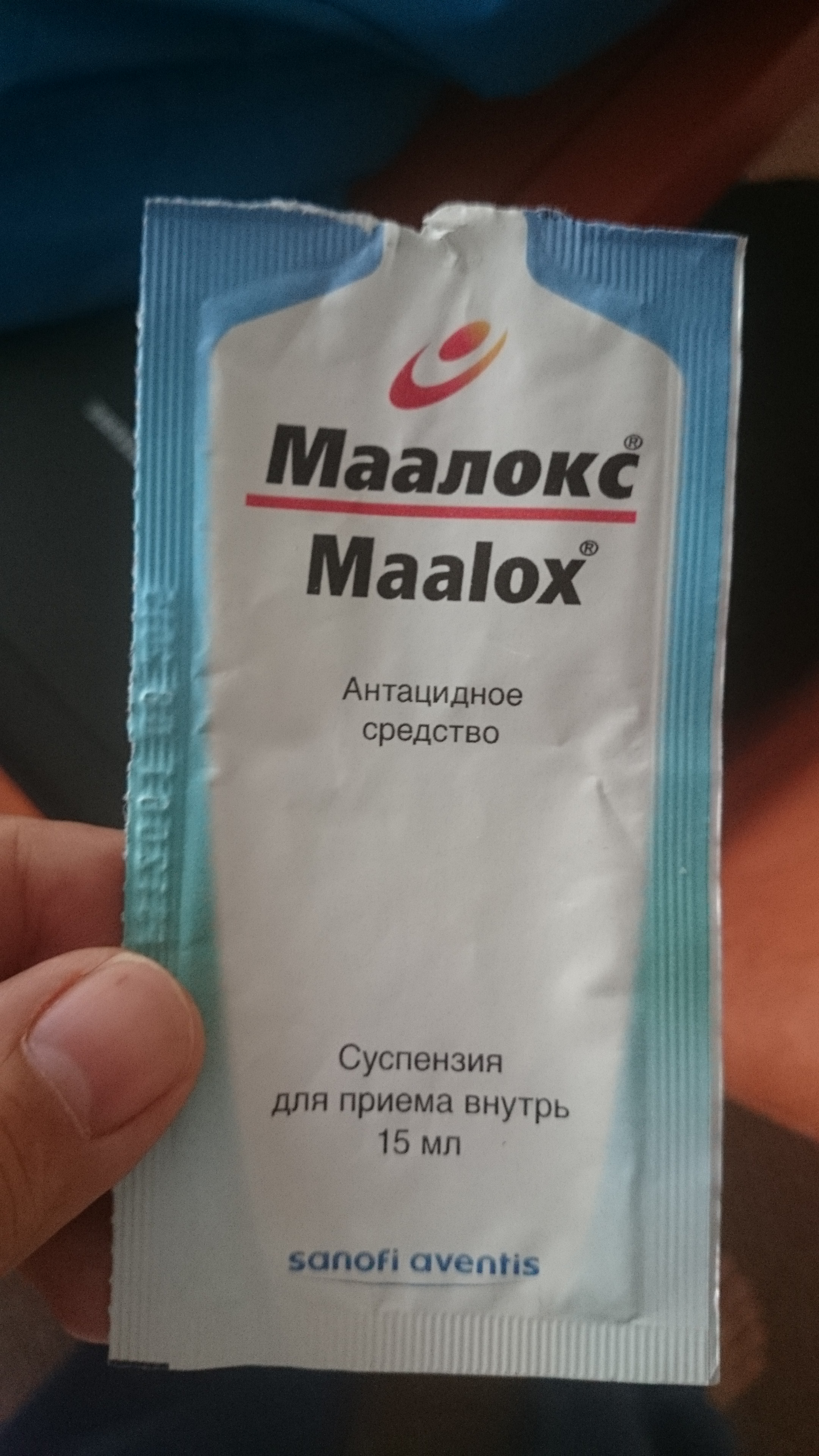
Tear open pouch

== Porous pouch ==
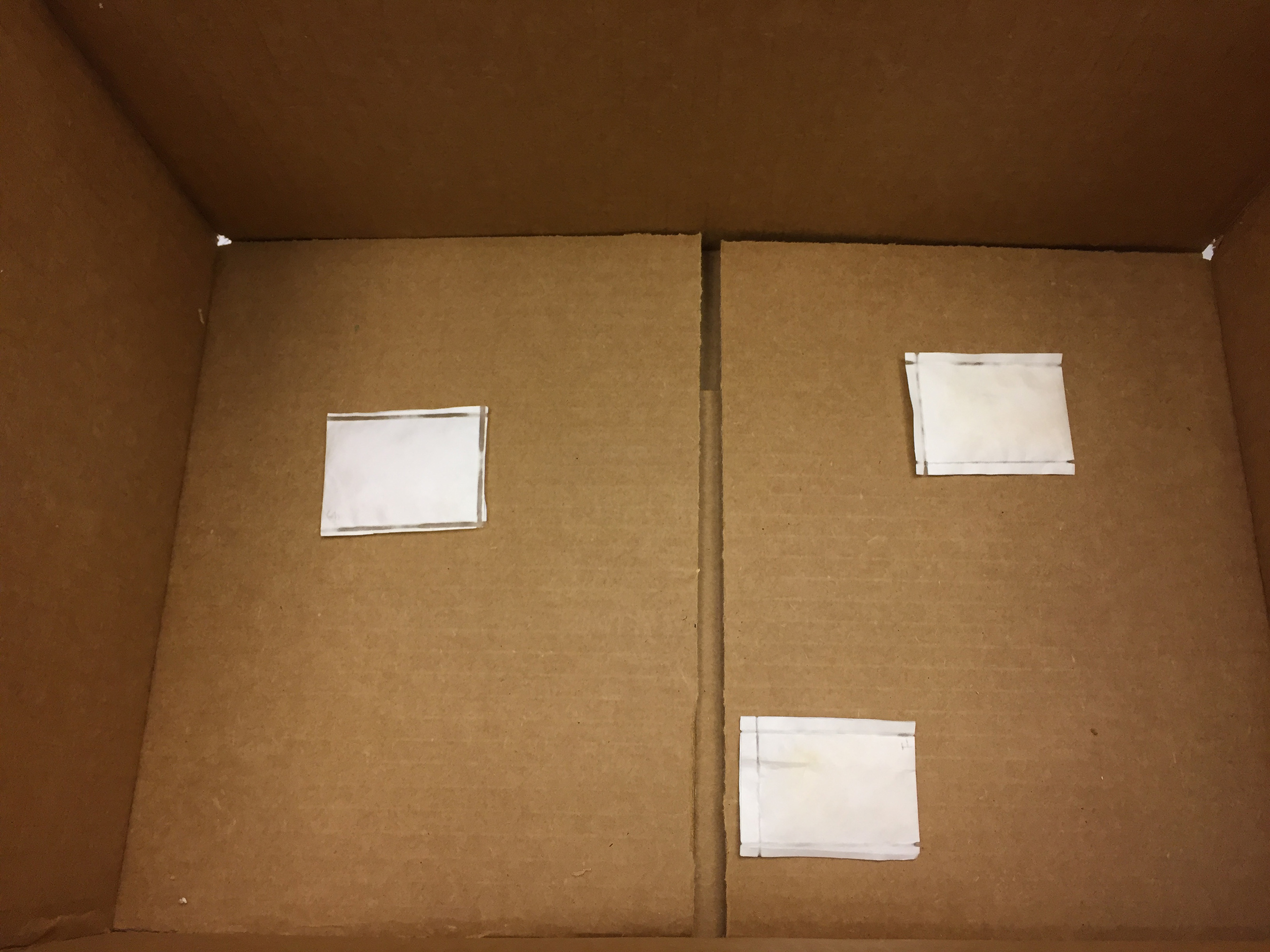
Chlorine dioxide pouches placed inside fruit-packing boxes kill pathogens but do not damage fruit.

Some packets are made of materials with known porosity to allow vapors from the pouch to escape. These pouches, also called sachets, can be placed in other packages to help control the atmosphere. Uses include: volatile corrosion inhibitors, desiccants, oxygen scavengers, etc.

== History ==
Benjamin Eisenstadt invented a machine that produced the modern sugar packet after a failed endeavor to package and sell tea bags, later packaging other items, including sauces.

== Variants ==
The Sanford Redmond designed the no mess dispenSRpak for one handed operation. Introduced into Australia in 1990, it is used in other countries, but the design has not been widely licensed in the USA.

In 2010, the H. J. Heinz Company designed a new ketchup packet. The new design was made with a cup and easy tear, thus making it easier to dip food without a plate along with holding three times as much ketchup. It has not been widely adopted.

=== Water sachets ===
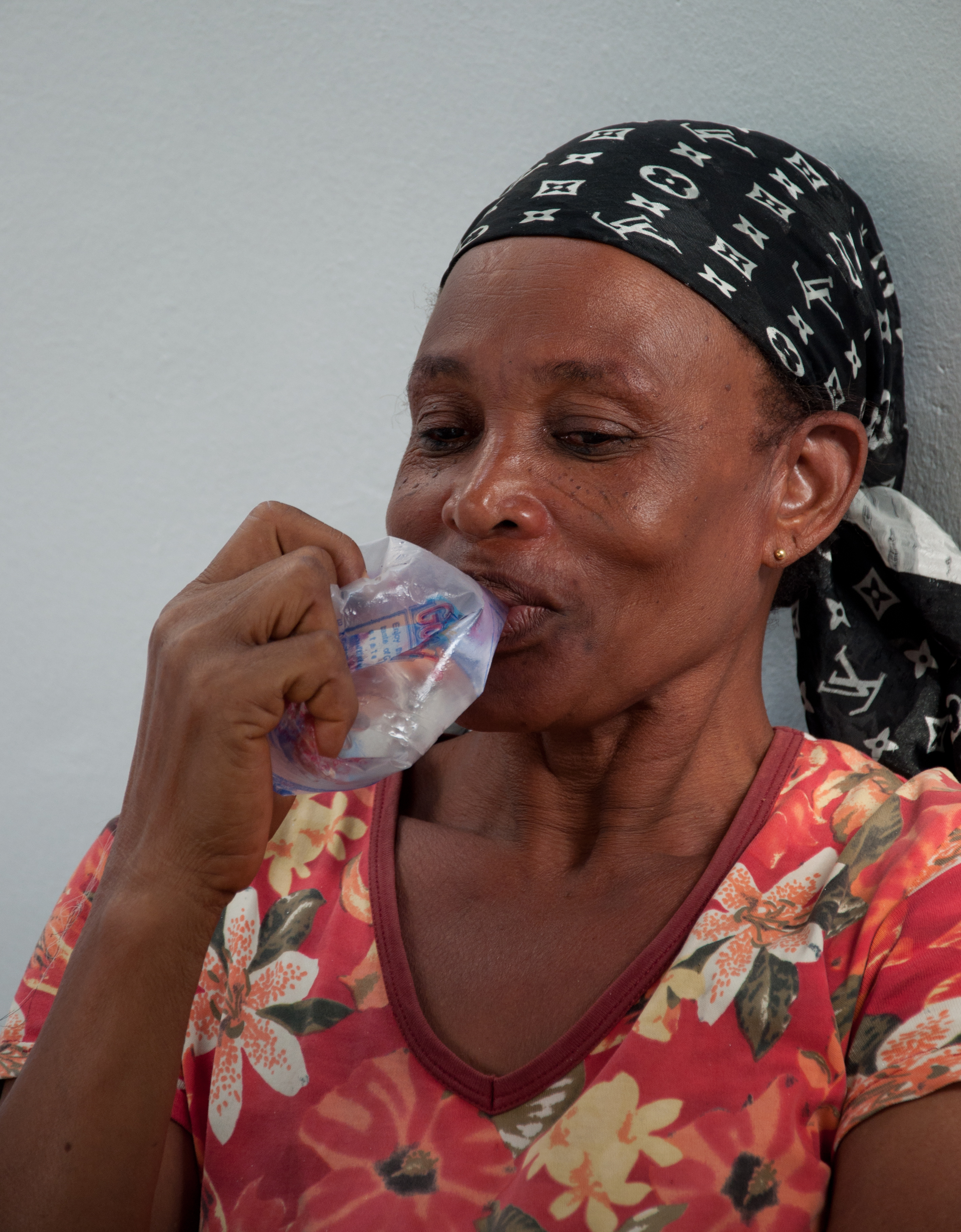
A woman drinking from a plastic sachet.

Water sachets or sachet water is a common form of selling pre-filtered or sanitized water in plastic, heat sealed bags in parts of the global south, and are especially popular in Africa. Water sachets are cheaper to produce than plastic bottles, and easier to transport. In some countries, water vendors refer to sachet water as "pure water".

High demand, and poor collection of waste from consumers, has resulted in significant plastic pollution and waste from sachets throughout West Africa. Accumulation of sachets frequently causes blocked stormwater drainage, and other issues. Some countries, such as Senegal, have banned disposable sachets.

Because sachets are frequently filled in small and often unregulated facilities, inadequate sanitary conditions can occasionally result in disease or contamination. However, in countries like Ghana consumers still prefer sachet water over other vendors and forms of water access, perceiving sachets to be of lower risk. This form of water distribution provides vital access to water in communities that otherwise would not have it. However, some scholars have identified this method of distribution as having potential human rights and social justice implications, limiting the right to water and sanitation.

== Records ==
In Collinsville, Illinois, the largest ketchup packet was created by H. J. Heinz Company for a fundraiser for the Collinsville Christian Academy. People could buy a bottle of ketchup for $1 to add to the ketchup packet. After it was filled, it weighed 1,500 lbs. and it was 8 ft × 4 ft (2.4 m × 1.2 m) across and 9.5 in (240 mm) thick.

Annual production of ketchup packets by Heinz alone is 11 billion.

== Pollution ==
Plastic sachets are a major contributor to litter and pollution, especially in low-income countries where many more household goods are sold in sachets in small quantities.

In June 2022, a Reuters report revealed that Unilever had lobbied the governments of India and the Philippines to stop legislation which would ban the sale of cosmetics in single-use plastic sachets, despite vowing in 2020 to stop using them. The design of these sachets had been called 'evil' by Hanneke Faber, Unilever's President for Global Food and Refreshments, 'because you cannot recycle it'. The bans were then dropped by lawmakers. In Sri Lanka, the company pressed the government to reconsider a proposed ban on sachets, and then tried to manoeuvre around the ban after regulations were implemented. Unilever sells 40 billion plastic sachets each year.

== See also ==
- Dip & Squeeze
- Sugar packet
- Teabag
- Bindle
