= Morita Kagaku Kogyo Co., Ltd =

Japanese sweetener manufacturer

Morita Kagaku Kogyo Co., Ltd was founded in 1949 as a sweetener manufacturer. With the social trend the company began research on natural products as the alternatives. In 1971, they developed a system for producing a natural stevia sweetener, which was the first in the world.

The company has more recently been involved manufacture of a sweetener based on rebaudioside A, extracted from the stevia leaf.

== History ==
Period	Events
Jul 1949	Morita Kaichi establishes Morita Kagaku Kogyo and begins the manufacturing and selling of synthetic sweeteners and other industrial pharmaceuticals.
Jan 1960	Morita Kagaku Kogyo becomes incorporated.
May 1971	Morita Kagaku Kogyo succeeds in the commercialization of Stevia sweeteners for the first time in the world and becomes a comprehensive manufacturer.
Oct 1974	First in the world succeeds in a large-scale cultivation of Stevia and establishes an integrated system from plant growth to extraction and refining processing.
Jun 1975	Discovery of the sweetest component of the Stevia leaf, Rebaudioside A.
Mar 1982	Develops a high Rebaudioside A product.
Jan 1985	Begins the cultivation of Stevia overseas.
May 1993	Obtains a patent on the manufacturing process of a new natural sweetener.
Jan 1994	Obtains a patent on the manufacturing process of a new sweetener.
Oct 1994	Launches the enzyme-treated Rebaudioside A series.
Nov 1999	Receives the Award for Excellent Food, Machinery, and Materials (established by the Japan Food Journal).
Feb 2000	Obtains a patent on a new variety of Stevia in the United States.
Jun 2000	Obtains a patent on a new variety of Stevia in the United States.
Sep 2000	Obtains a botanical patent.
Nov 2000	Receives the 20th Century Food Industry Award (established by the Japan Food Journal).
Sep 2002	Obtains a patent on the α-glycosylated Stevia sweetener.
Aug 2003	Obtains a patent on Acesulfame K and Stevia sweetener.
Mar 2005	Applies for patents on a new breed of Stevia plant, a manufacturing process, and a sweetener.

== Product ==
Karori Zero is a Japanese powder-like sweetener product made from the latest technology of Morita Kagaku Kogyo Co., Ltd. It is made with rebaudioside A and Erythritol, which have been proved to be safe for human intake.
