= Pepsi True =

Cola-flavored carbonated soft drink

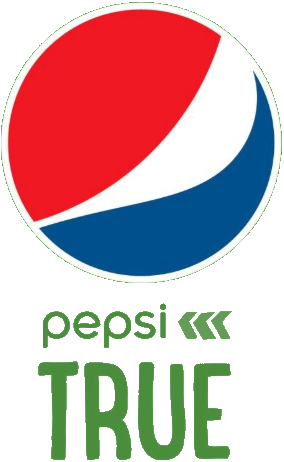

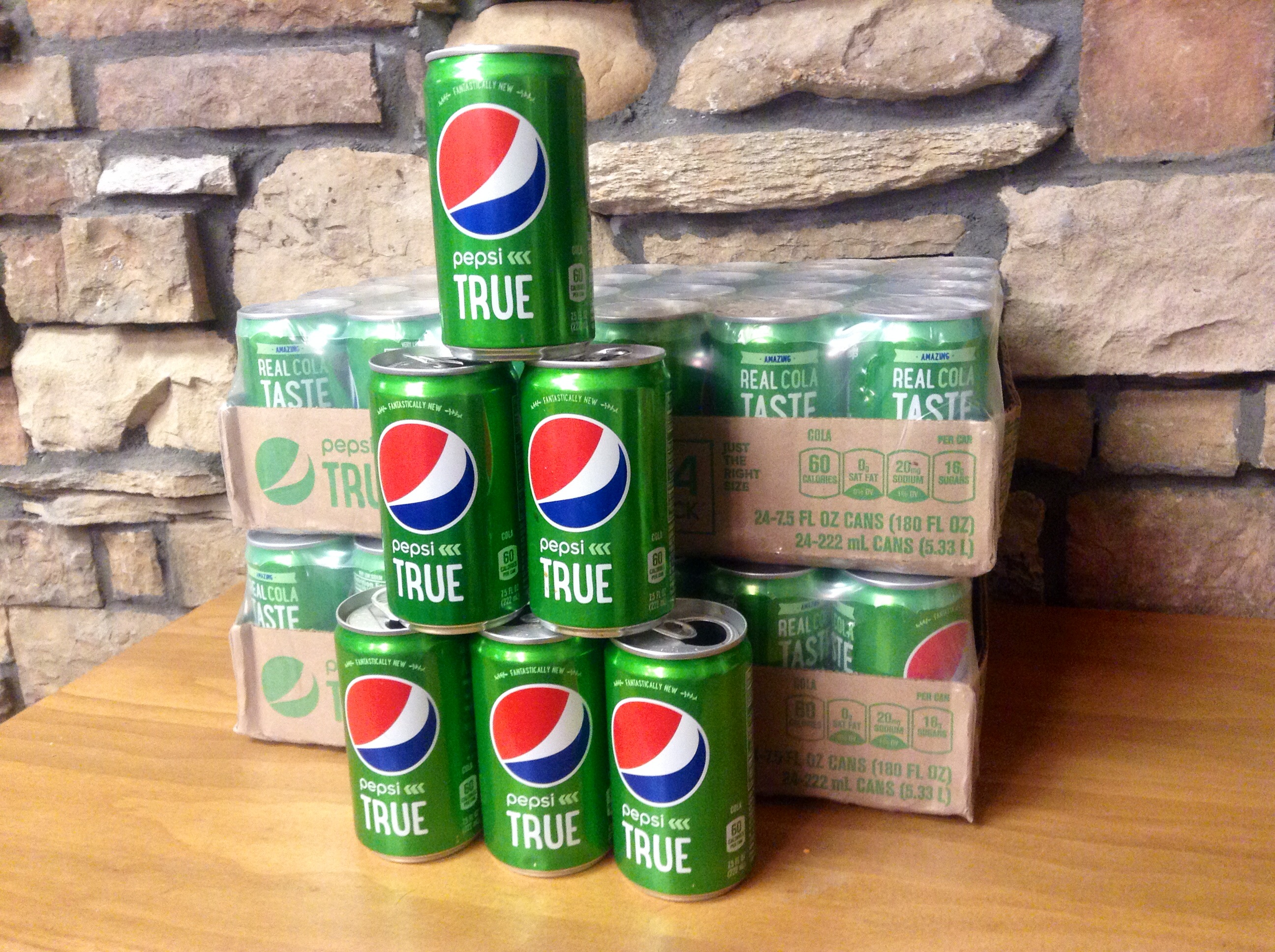
- Cans of Pepsi True
- Type: Mid-calorie cola
- Manufacturer: PepsiCo
- Origin: United States
- Introduced: 2014
- Related products: Pepsi Next

Pepsi True (stylized as pepsi TRUE) is a discontinued cola-flavored carbonated soft drink. It is a variant of the Pepsi cola range and is sweetened with sugar and stevia. Pepsi True launched in the United States on October 12, 2014, as PepsiCo's answer to Coca-Cola Life. It was sold in green cans and in glass bottles with green labels. It was discontinued some time before April 2020.

== See also ==
- Pepsi Next
