= Stevia World =

Indian agrotechnology company

- Product type: Natural sweetener, FMCG
- Country: India
- Introduced: 2013
- Markets: Global
- Website: steviaworld.com

Stevia World Agrotech Pvt Ltd is an agrotechnology company specializing in the growing and processing of stevia leaves, headquartered in Bangalore, India. The company primarily focuses on growing and processing stevia at relatively low costs, adhering to high environmental standards using good agricultural practices. Stevia World provides services to farmers for contract-based farming.
