= Sweet and Low =

Sweet and Low may refer to:

- "Sweet and Low" (poem), a poem by Alfred, Lord Tennyson, set as a part-song in 1863 by Sir Joseph Barnby
- Sweet and Low (1914 film), a 1914 American silent short film
- Sweet and Low (1947 film), a 1947 American musical short film
- Sweet and Low (musical), a 1930 musical composed by Dana Suesse
- Sweet and Low (TV series), a 1959 Australian television series
- "Sweet and Low" (Augustana song), a 2008 song from Augustana's album Can't Love, Can't Hurt
- "Sweet and Low" (Deborah Harry song), a 1990 song from Deborah Harry's solo album Def, Dumb and Blonde

== See also ==
- Sweet'n Low, a popular brand of artificial sweetener
