= Crystal Light =

Line of powdered beverage mixes produced by Kraft Foods

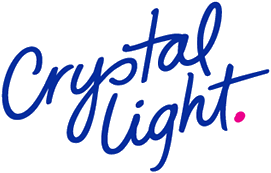

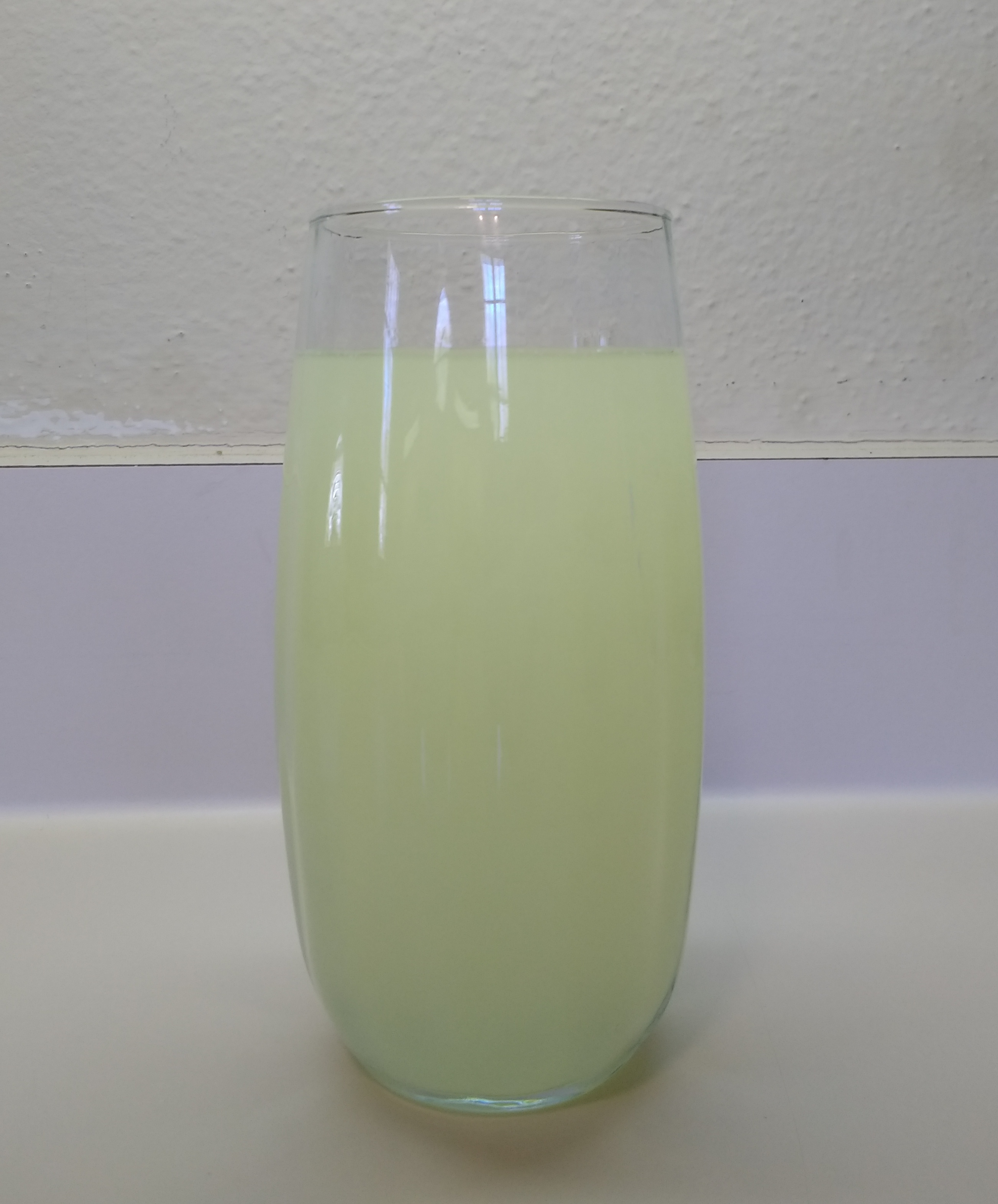
- Glass of Crystal light lemonade
- Product type: Drink mix
- Current owner: Kraft Heinz in North America; Mondelez International Outside North America
- Country: U.S.
- Introduced: 1982; 44 years ago
- Previous owners: General Foods; Kraft Foods Inc.
- Website: crystallight.com

Crystal Light (Also Known As Clight outside North America) is an American brand of powdered and artificially sweetened beverage mixes produced by Kraft Heinz in North America and Mondelez International Outside North America. It was introduced in 1982 to a test market and released to the public in April 1984. General Foods, a now defunct company, were the original sellers of the product, but now it is sold by Kraft Foods. It is available in a wide variety of flavors, such as lemonade, sweet tea, and fruit punch.

== History ==
=== Test marketing and introduction ===
Crystal Light was sold in test markets beginning in 1982. As of mid-1983, it was being sold in 11 test areas. It was introduced throughout the United States in April 1984. General Foods sold $150 million of Crystal Light during the product's first year on national markets, representing 20% of all powdered drink mixes and 2/3 of all sugar-free drink mixes in the United States.

=== Advertisements ===
In the 1980s, ads for the product featured Linda Evans (who also featured in print ads for the product), Priscilla Presley, and Raquel Welch.

=== Ingredients ===
Crystal Light is sweetened with a combination of aspartame, acesulfame potassium, sucralose, and/or sugar depending on the specific product line and flavor. First packaged in multi-serve canisters, Crystal Light launched single-serve "On The Go" packets in 2004. In 2009, Crystal Light redesigned its multi-serve packaging. On a finished case goods basis, the new design uses 250 tons less packaging than the original. In 2010, Crystal Light launched Pure Fitness, a "naturally-sweetened" low-calorie fitness drink mix which is sweetened with sugar and Truvia, a sweetener derived from the stevia plant. It is sold in "On The Go" packets. In 2011, Crystal Light Pure Fitness was renamed Crystal Light Pure, and three additional flavors were introduced. In April 2012, several Crystal Light varieties were added to the line of sodamix syrups for SodaStream home soda makers.

Kraft Heinz, the parent company of Crystal Light, offers a product locator on its website to help locate flavors in a desired location. Crystal Light is sold in the U.S. and Canada.

Calories per serving have varied throughout the years; non-zero calorie flavors were once as low as 4 calories in 1990 and now, they may be as high as 15 in 2018, depending on flavor. However, it's not certain if the change is due to the use of new ingredients or if serving sizes have increased.

Some Crystal Light products, notably those designated as Crystal Light Energy, also contain an appreciable amount of added caffeine. The company has even experimented with displaying a prominent "with caffeine" tag below the product name on packaging. "Crystal Light products with Energy positioning contain added caffeine," according to Kraft Heinz. "Crystal Light Energy Wild Strawberry contains 60 mg caffeine per 8 fl oz serving". In fact, all Crystal Light Energy flavors contain this same amount of caffeine. Certain other Crystal Light flavors have long included caffeine as an ingredient. The label of Crystal Light Peach Iced Tea, for instance, says that the flavor contains "25mg caffeine per serving," or about as much an eight-ounce (240 mL) cup of black tea.

== Products ==
All product information is based on information and products offered by Crystal Light's official website, as of January 2019.

=== Classics ===
- Berry Sangria (0 cal)
- Black Cherry Lime (0 cal)
- Blackberry Lemonade (0 cal)
- Blueberry Raspberry (0 cal)
- Caribbean Cooler (0 cal)
- Cherry Pomegranate (15 cal)
- Concord Grape (15 cal)
- Fruit Punch (15 cal)
- Lemonade (15 cal)
- Mango Passionfruit (0 cal)
- Orange (15 cal)
- Pink Lemonade (15 cal)
- Pomegranate Lemonade (0 cal)
- Raspberry Ice (15 cal)
- Raspberry Lemonade (15 cal)
- Strawberry Kiwi (15 cal)
- Strawberry Lemonade (0 cal)
- Strawberry Orange Banana (15 cal)
- Strawberry Watermelon (15 cal)
- Sweet Tea
- Tropical Coconut (0 cal)

=== Pure ===
- Grape (5 cal)
- Lemon (5 cal)
- Lemon Iced Tea (5 cal)
- Mixed Berry Energy (15 cal)
- Peach Iced Tea (5 cal)
- Raspberry Lemonade (5 cal)
- Strawberry Kiwi (5 cal)
- Strawberry Lemonade Energy (15 cal)
- Tangerine Mango (5 cal)
- Tropical Blend (5 cal)
- Tropical Citrus Energy (15 cal)
