= Bernard Food Industries =

American food corporation

Bernard Food Industries is an American food product corporation. It is part of a family business established in 1947. Bernard Food Industries is headquartered in Evanston, Illinois; a Chicago suburb. The company was founded by Jules Bernard and is currently controlled by Steven Bernard.

It's brands include the Bernard, Calorie Control, Sweet'N Low, Sans Sucre and Longhorn Grill.

The company has produced, for some years, empty tin cans, labelled as "Bernard Dehydrated Water", as a novelty item.
