= Sugar packet =

Form of packaging for sugar

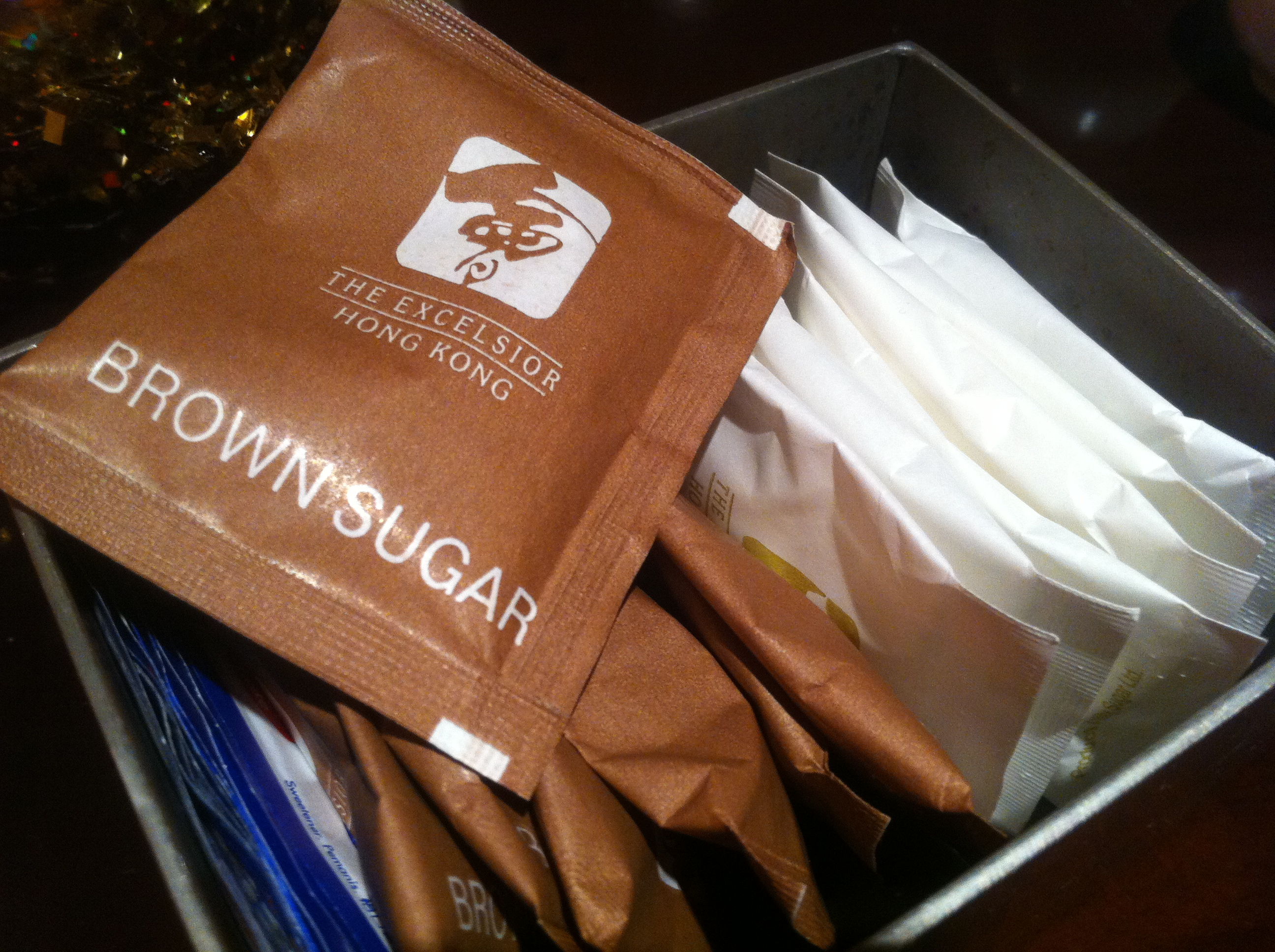
Packets of brown and white sugar

A sugar packet is a delivery method for one serving of sugar or other sweetener. Sugar packets are commonly supplied in restaurants, coffeehouses, and tea houses, where they are preferred to sugar bowls or sugar dispensers for reasons of neatness, sanitation, spill control, and to some extent portion control.

== Statistics ==
A typical sugar packet contains 2 to 4 grams of sugar. Some sugar packets in countries such as Poland contain 5 to 10 grams of sugar. Sugar packet sizes, shapes, and weights differ by brand, region, and other factors. Because a gram of any carbohydrate contains 4 nutritional calories (also referred to as "food calories" or kilo-calories), a typical four-gram sugar packet has 16 nutritional calories.

The amount of sugar substitute in a packet generally differs from the volume and weight of sugar in a packet. Packets of sugar substitutes typically contain an amount of sweetener that provides an amount of sweetness comparable to a packet containing sugar.

Packets are often colored to provide simple identification of the type of sweetener in the pack.

== History ==
The sugar cube was used in restaurants until it began to be replaced directly after World War II. At this time, machines were made that could produce small packets of sugar for nearly half the cost.

The sugar packet was invented by Benjamin Eisenstadt, the founder of Cumberland Packing best known as the manufacturer, distributor and marketer of Sweet 'N Low. Eisenstadt had been a tea bag factory worker, and became irritated by the task of refilling and unclogging all the sugar dispensers in his Brooklyn cafeteria across from the Brooklyn Navy Yard. He did not patent the idea and lost market share after discussions with larger sugar companies. However, Sweet 'N Low artificial sweetener packets were an outgrowth of that business.

== Collecting ==
The hobby of collecting sugar packets is known as sucrology. Sucrologists normally collect the small packets of sugar that are most commonly found in restaurants, hotels and airlines. Collectors can, for example, focus on the variety of types of sugar or brand names. Sugar packets are also handy forms of advertisement for businesses.

There are numerous sucrology themed clubs in Europe. The most notable club is the UK Sucrologists' Club. Clubs may hold annual meetings locally or internationally, where sucrologists from around the world gather to trade sugar packets and meet fellow sucrologists. The most important international meeting is held in Italy in Pieve di Cento (Bologna) and brings together 150 exhibitors from 14 countries.

=== Guinness World Record ===
On May 14, 2013, a world record was made by Ralf Schröder in Germany whose collection consists of 14,502 sugar packets. Previous record belonged to Kristen Dennis of Chicago, US, who logged 9,596 sugar packets in 2012.
