= Truvia =

Sugar substitute

Truvia (stylized truvía; pronounced /truˈviːə/ true-VEE-ə) is a brand of stevia-based sugar substitute developed jointly by The Coca-Cola Company and Cargill. It is distributed and marketed by Cargill as a tabletop sweetener as well as a food ingredient. Truvia is made of stevia leaf extract, erythritol, and natural flavors, depending on the type of product. Cargill classifies Truvia as a calorie-free sweetener.

Cargill has settled lawsuits alleging deceptive marketing of Truvia as "natural". Since its launch in 2008, Truvia Sweetener has become the second best-selling sugar substitute in units in the U.S. behind Splenda, surpassing Equal and Sweet'n Low. Truvia competes with Stevia In The Raw, the #2 brand of stevia, owned by Cumberland Packaging who also makes Sweet 'n Low.

== Tabletop sweetener ==
Truvia tabletop sweetener is marketed to consumers as a packet sweetener for food and beverages. This makes it a direct competitor to existing packet sweeteners Splenda (sucralose), Equal (aspartame), Sweet'n Low (saccharin), and table sugar. It is available in the United States in 40-ct, 80-ct, 140-ct, and 240-ct single-serve packages. It is also available in the U.S. in a 9.8 oz "spoonable" container that is the equivalent of an 80-ct box. One packet of Truvia natural sweetener provides the same sweetness as two teaspoons of sugar. Truvia also makes a 75% reduced calorie sugar blend with stevia sweetener in both Cane Sugar and Brown Sugar varieties.

== Ingredients ==
Truvia ingredients include erythritol (a sugar alcohol), stevia leaf extract, and natural flavorings.

== Food ingredient ==
In addition to the Truvia tabletop sweetener, Truvia is used as a food ingredient. The Truvia web site lists products that use Truvia as a sweetener, including flavors of vitamin water, Sprite Green, All Sport Naturally Zero, Blue Sky Free, Crystal Light Pure, and some varieties of Odwalla juices. Cargill also sells a Truvia Cane Sugar Blend product that is a suitable sugar substitute for baking.

== Safety and health effects ==
=== Gastrointestinal side effects ===
Most of Truvia's side effects are related to erythritol which is a sugar alcohol. Sugar alcohols are valuable as sweeteners since they cause little to no rise in blood glucose levels as sugar does. However, the downside to most sugar alcohols is their propensity to cause gastrointestinal side effects. Erythritol is unique in that among these compounds it has one of the most favorable nutritional profiles. Erythritol is almost as sweet as sucrose, is virtually non-caloric, and cannot be fermented by gut bacteria present in the small intestine. According to Truvia's website, up to 90% of erythritol is absorbed by the small intestine and excreted unchanged in the urine. Only a small amount of it will reach the large intestine where GI symptoms, like bloating, flatulence, and cramping usually originate.

Truvia's website claims:

Studies with erythritol show almost no side effects reported unless very high doses are consumed at a single sitting in liquid form on an empty stomach(Bornet FR 1996). It took at least 4 times the amount of erythritol to generate looser stools, compared with the level of sorbitol, a very commonly used and well tolerated sugar alcohol (Oku T 1996). One study gave the test subjects 1 gram per kilogram (1 kilogram is equal to 2.2 pounds) for five days (Tetzloff W 1996). So a 220 pound person would be taking 100 grams of erythritol every day, or 33 packets of Truvia® natural sweetener. These doses are far beyond the expected daily use and were delivered in a way that is very unlike our normal eating pattern. However...a few study subjects reported cramping, noisy stomach churning or, more commonly, loose stool after consuming it. This pattern has been seen with many types of sugars and carbohydrates. There are just some people who may have a limit to how much they can consume without having mild, brief symptoms.

== Controversy ==
Cargill, the manufacturer of Truvia, has had litigation brought against it in four separate class-action lawsuits in 2013. The suits claimed that Cargill was deceptive in its marketing of Truvia as a "natural" sweetener, with the suit stating that stevia leaf extract and erythritol are "highly processed". While the FDA has been generally ambiguous about its opinion of the use of "natural" as a qualifier for food, Cargill decided to settle out of court. In 2014, Cargill settled a class-action lawsuit grounded in false and misleading advertising for $6.1 million.

== Availability ==
On July 4, 2011, the EU's Standing Committee on Food Chain and Animal Health recommended the approval of high purity stevia extracts for use as a food ingredient throughout the EU.
