= Stevioside =

Names
- IUPAC name β-D-Glucopyranosyl 13-[β-D-glucopyranosyl-(1→2)-β-D-glucopyranosyloxy]-5β,8α,9β,10α,13α-kaur-16-en-18-oate
- Systematic IUPAC name (4R,4aS,6aR,9S,11aR,11bS)-9-{[(2S,3R,4S,5S,6R)-4,5-Dihydroxy-6-(hydroxymethyl)-3-{[(2S,3R,4S,5S,6R)-3,4,5-trihydroxy-6-(hydroxymethyl)oxan-2-yl]oxy}oxan-2-yl]oxy}-4,11b-dimethyl-8-methylidenetetradecahydro-6a,9-methanocyclohepta[a]naphthalene-4-carboxylate

Identifiers
CAS Number	57817-89-7
3D model (JSmol)	Interactive image
ChEBI	CHEBI:9271
ChEMBL	ChEMBL444122
ChemSpider	390625
ECHA InfoCard	100.055.414
EC Number	260-975-5
KEGG	C09189
PubChem CID	442089
UNII	0YON5MXJ9P
CompTox Dashboard (EPA)	DTXSID7021281
- InChI: InChI=1S/C38H60O18/c1-16-11-37-9-5-20-35(2,7-4-8-36(20,3)34(50)55-32-29(49)26(46)23(43)18(13-40)52-32)21(37)6-10-38(16,15-37)56-33-30(27(47)24(44)19(14-41)53-33)54-31-28(48)25(45)22(42)17(12-39)51-31/h17-33,39-49H,1,4-15H2,2-3H3/t17-,18-,19-,20+,21+,22-,23-,24-,25+,26+,27+,28-,29-,30-,31+,32+,33+,35-,36-,37-,38+/m1/s1
- SMILES: C[C@@]12CCC[C@@]([C@H]1CC[C@]34[C@H]2CC[C@](C3)(C(=C)C4)O[C@H]5[C@@H]([C@H]([C@@H]([C@H](O5)CO)O)O)O[C@H]6[C@@H]([C@H]([C@@H]([C@H](O6)CO)O)O)O)(C)C(=O)O[C@H]7[C@@H]([C@H]([C@@H]([C@H](O7)CO)O)O)O

Properties
Chemical formula	C_{38}H_{60}O_{18}
Molar mass	804.8722
Appearance	white powder
- Except where otherwise noted, data are given for materials in their standard state (at 25 °C [77 °F], 100 kPa). Infobox references

Stevioside is a glycoside derived from the stevia plant, which can be used as a sweetener.

== Origin ==
Stevioside is the main sweetener (along with rebaudioside A) found in the leaves of Stevia rebaudiana, a plant originating in South America. Dried leaves, as well as aqueous extracts, have been used for decades as a sweetener in many countries, notably in Latin America and Asia (Japan, China). Stevioside was discovered in 1931 by French chemists who gave it its name. The sweetening power of stevioside was estimated to be about 300 times stronger than cane sugar.

== Safety ==
Since 2008, the U.S. Food and Drug Administration has not objected to the use of stevia extracts and some purified steviosides, mainly stevioside and rebaudioside, as GRAS for use as an ingredient in manufactured foods. Evidence of benefit is lacking for long-term effects on weight loss and heart disease risks.

== See also ==
- Steviol glycoside
