= Dietary Foods Ltd =

UK food manufacturer

Dietary Foods Ltd is a UK company that manufactures many food product lines including Sweet'N Low sweetener products for the EMEA, APAC and Latin America regions.

It was founded in 1971 and is located in Soham, Cambridgeshire, England.
