= Stevia cultivation in Paraguay =

Paraguay is one of the main countries where Stevia rebaudiana or kaʼa heʼẽ (Guarani) is cultivated. In 2014 an area of 2,300 hectares was devoted to this crop, producing 3,680 tonnes, according to estimates of the National Directorate of Censuses and Statistics of the Ministry of Agriculture and Livestock. The Paraguayan departments that produce the greatest yield (kilograms per hectare) are San Pedro, Caaguazú, Itapúa and Alto Paraná.

== Exports ==
Exports of Stevia extracts (especially sweeteners) and of the leaves during the period 2007–2014 reached a cumulative total of USD 7,600,000. The main export destinations of Stevia from Paraguay in 2014 were the European Union (47%), China (37%), the wider Mercosur area (Note: Member states (Argentina, Brazil, Uruguay and Venezuela), associated states (Bolivia, Chile, Colombia, Ecuador and Peru), out-of-region partners (Israel, Egypt, India, Botswana, Lesotho, Namibia, South Africa and Swaziland).) (11%), United States (1%), and Rest of the World (4%).

== Companies and employment in the sector ==
In 2010 there were roughly 40 companies in the country devoted to this product, employing in total some 20,000 people in production, industrial processing and export. Among the leading companies in this sector in the period 2007–2014 were Steviapar S.A., Purecircle South America S.A., NL Stevia S.A., Nativia Guaraní S.A., during the period of 2007-2014.

== See also ==
- Economy of Paraguay
