= Coca-Cola Life =

Version of Coca-Cola

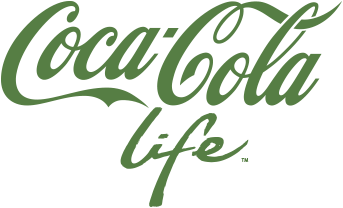

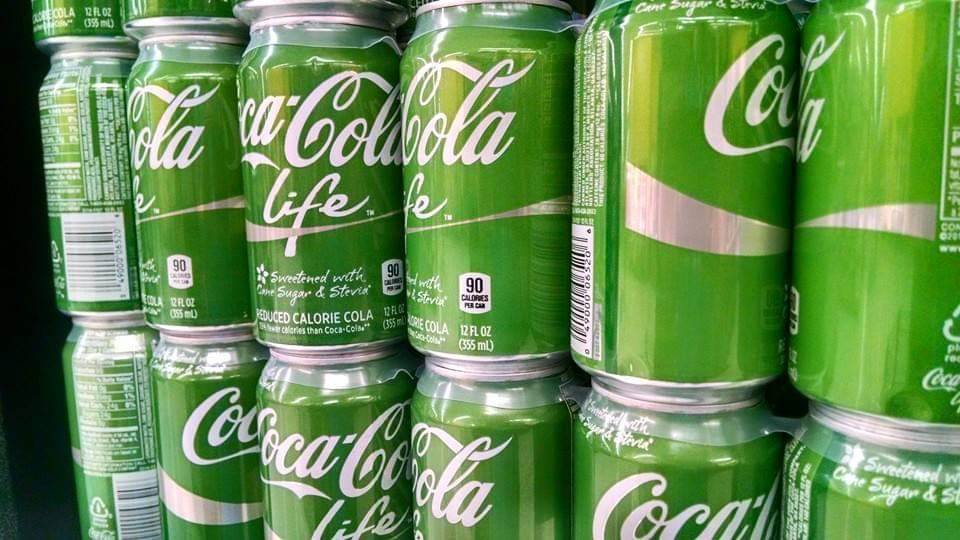
- Coca-Cola Life cans on a public grocery store shelf
- Type: Mid-calorie cola
- Manufacturer: The Coca-Cola Company
- Distributor: The Coca-Cola Company
- Origin: Argentina; Chile
- Introduced: 2013
- Discontinued: 2020
- Related products: Coca-Cola; Diet Coke; Pepsi True
- Website: Official website

Coca-Cola Life was a reduced-calorie version of Coca-Cola introduced in 2013, using a combination of stevia and sugar as sweeteners. It was first released in Argentina and Chile after five years of research together in these countries, before expanding to other markets around the world. The formulation varied by market location, and in some areas the original formulation had been phased out in favor of a zero-calorie version sweetened with stevia only. The drink was discontinued in 2020 as part of the Coca-Cola Company discontinuing underperforming brands.

== Ingredients ==
The drink contains stevia leaf extract, and is the first Coca-Cola variant to use this ingredient. However, it is not the first product owned by the Coca-Cola Company to use stevia. Over 45 products distributed by Coca-Cola use stevia extract, including Vitamin Water and Seagram's Ginger Ale.

Coca-Cola Life formulations typically also contained sugar, but used less sugar than traditional Coca-Cola. In the US, for example, a single 8 US fluid ounces (240 ml) serving contained around 60 calories and 17 grams of carbohydrates from sugar (which constituted about 1/3 less sugar than traditional Coca-Cola per serving).

== Packaging ==
The drink was available in glass bottles, plastic bottles, and aluminum cans. The logo was a small green leaf. In 2018, a red disc was added behind the name for greater brand identification, as part of Coca-Cola's new "global packaging" scheme. The plastic bottle was theoretically fully recyclable (like normal PET bottles) and 30 percent plant-based, with fossil-fuel plastic accounting for the remaining 70 percent of the bottle.

== Distribution ==
Coca-Cola Life was launched in Argentina in June 2013, in Chile in November of that year, in Sweden in June 2014 and in the United Kingdom in September 2014. It has subsequently been launched in many other countries. Coca-Cola Life tried to co-exist with Diet Coke and Coca-Cola Zero in the Argentine and Chilean market, but it has been slowly removed from those markets due to its low reception from customers. Due to decrease in sales, and increase of Coca-Cola Zero Sugar sales, Coca-Cola Life was discontinued in the UK in June 2017.

Coca-Cola Life has been available in:

- Argentina
- Armenia
- Australia (later branded as 'Coca-Cola with Stevia')
- Austria
- Belgium
- Brazil (called Coca-Cola com Stevia)
- Bulgaria
- Canada (2015-2019)
- Chile
- Colombia
- Costa Rica
- Croatia
- Cyprus
- Czech Republic
- Denmark (2016-2019)
- Ecuador
- Estonia
- France
- Germany
- Greece
- Hong Kong
- Italy
- Ireland
- Japan, 2015
- Latvia
- Lithuania
- Luxembourg
- Malta
- Malaysia
- Namibia
- Netherlands
- New Zealand
- Norway (2015-2017)
- Philippines
- Poland
- Romania
- Russia
- Singapore
- Slovakia
- South Africa
- South Korea
- Sweden (2014-2017)
- Switzerland
- Ukraine (since 2017)
- United Arab Emirates
- United Kingdom
- United States
- Uruguay

=== Australia ===
Coca-Cola Life was introduced into Australia in March 2015. In early 2017, the brand was dropped due to poor sales and replaced with 'Coca-Cola with Stevia', which contains less sugar than Coca-Cola Life.

=== Belgium & Luxembourg ===
Coca-Cola Life was introduced in Belgium and Luxembourg in early 2015. Distribution was stopped in September 2018.

=== Canada ===
The roll-out of Coca-Cola Life in Canada began in the fall of 2016. In Canada, the product is sweetened from natural sources and contains 50% fewer calories than regular colas. The nutrition data on the Canadian version of product shows 25 g carbohydrates (25 g sugar), 100 calories and 70 mg sodium and 15 mg potassium per 500 ml. By early 2020, the product was replaced with "Coca-Cola Stevia", a zero-calorie drink which is sweetened with stevia only; the "Coca-Cola Life" logo remains on the back of packaging for continuity.

Ingredients (sugar/stevia formulation): Carbonated water, sugar, caramel colour, natural flavour, phosphoric acid, sodium phosphate, sodium benzoate, stevia extract, caffeine, and citric acid.

=== New Zealand ===
In May 2018, Coca-Cola Life was replaced in New Zealand by Coca-Cola Stevia No Sugar.

=== Switzerland ===
Coca-Cola Life was introduced in Switzerland in 2015 and withdrawn in March 2018.

=== United States ===
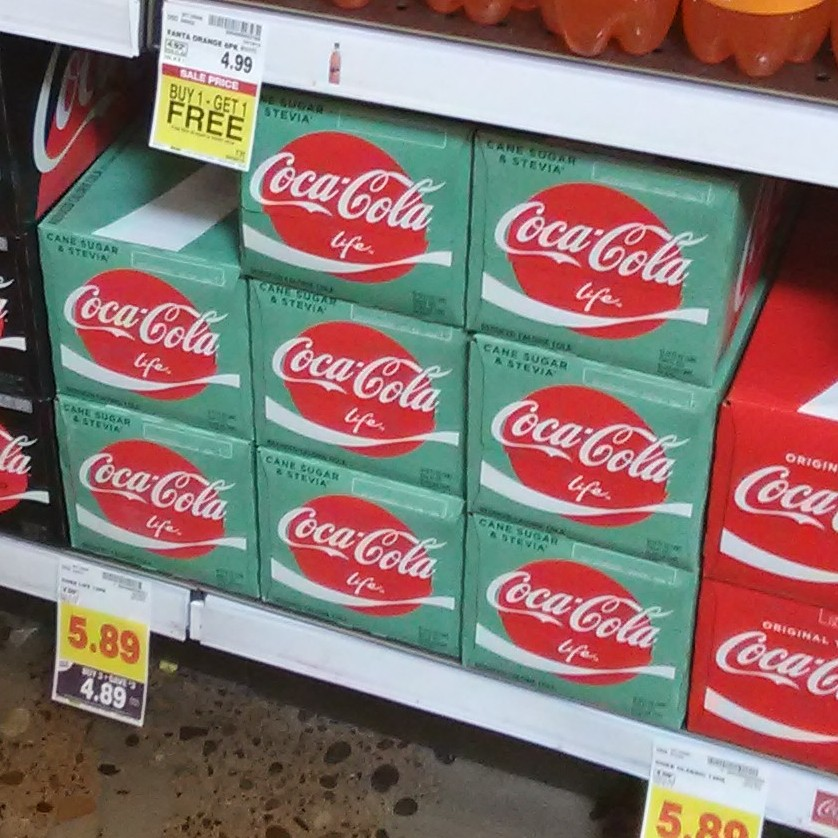
Boxes of 12-pack 12 oz (355 ml) Coca-Cola life on a store shelf in the United States circa April 2019

Coca-Cola Life was released in limited areas in the summer of 2014 with the product being sold at a number of locations of The Fresh Market grocery store. Nationwide distribution began on November 4, 2014. The release of Coca-Cola Life is the first Coca-Cola product launch in the U.S. since 2006. The nutrition data on the U.S. version of product shows 24 g carbohydrates (24 g sugar), 90 calories and 35 mg sodium. The can label indicates 28 mg caffeine per 12 fl.oz.

Before the full-scale national launch, the market research firm Haynes & Co. said that early research findings showed a positive view by consumers toward the drink. The company planned to host 4,000 events at stores where people could sample the drink for free. To help with its advertising and public marketing campaign, the company hired Fitzgerald and Company to develop strategy and promote the product on social media.

=== United Kingdom ===
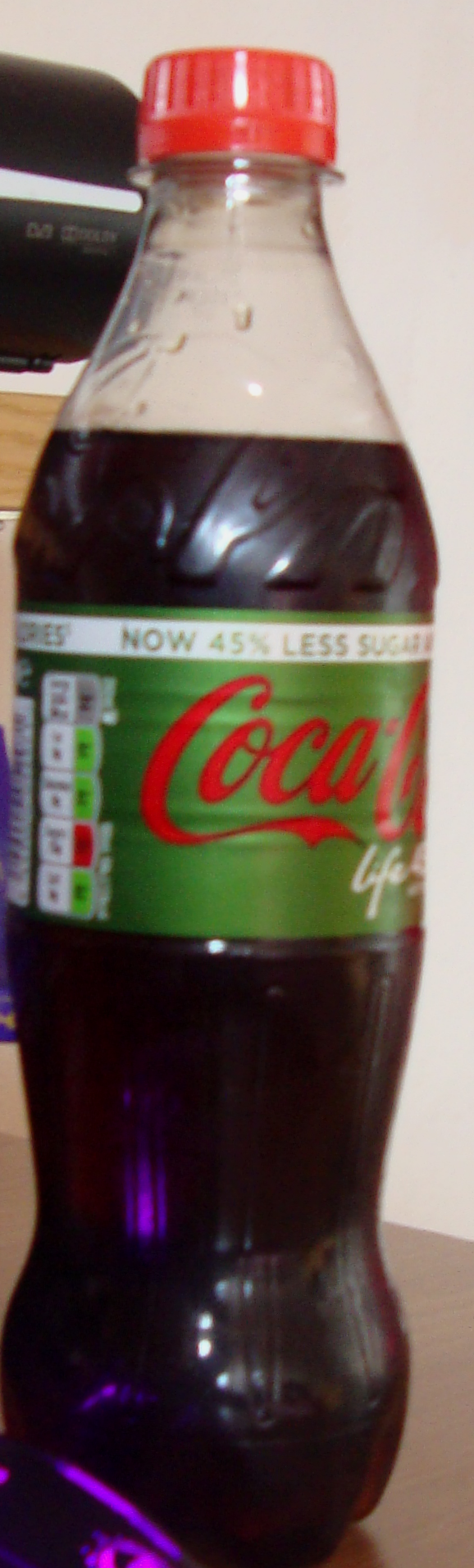
Final revision of the Coca-Cola Life logo in the United Kingdom

Coca-Cola began offering the drink to U.K. customers in September 2014. The offering was the first new Coca-Cola product introduced in the U.K. in eight years. In 2016, it was reformulated to contain less sugar than regular Coke (45% less). On April 5, 2017, it was announced that due to a decrease in sales, and increase in Coca-Cola Zero Sugar sales, that Life would no longer be sold and it was discontinued in June 2017. The list of ingredients was carbonated water, cane sugar, caramel color, caffeine, phosphoric acid, and stevia.

To promote the drink, at one event the company hired British model and actress Rosie Huntington-Whiteley, who promoted the drink at a launch party in London in September.

In August, The Telegraph sent a correspondent, Harry Wallop, and a film crew onto the streets of Victoria to conduct a taste test of random people. In a video news segment produced from the taste test, Wallop says that most people could tell the difference in taste between Coca-Cola classic and Coca-Cola Life, although many people told him they preferred the taste of Life.

In the United Kingdom, the Coca-Cola company has led several health initiatives, and it considers the introduction of Coca-Cola Life as a vital component to its initiatives. Specifically, the company promoted lower obesity rates and more active lifestyles among British people. The company insisted in connecting the roll-out of Life with its stance on promoting health.

The Grocer magazine in the U.K. conducted a blind taste test among seven of its staff members in June. According to The Grocer, all seven tasters preferred the taste of Life to the other products. (The article in The Grocer did not specify which products Life was tested against.) However, all seven tasters said that they thought they had been tasting Coca-Cola Classic.

=== Argentina ===
In Argentina, the launch of Coca-Cola Life placed an emphasis on the recyclable bottle. The drink is distributed in Coca-Cola's "PlantBottle", which is made up of recyclable petroleum-based material plus around 30 percent plant-based material.

Coca-Cola released a television ad in Argentina called "Parents" to promote Coca-Cola Life. Marketing in Argentina was focused, much like in the U.K., around healthy lifestyles. "Parents" is a humorous commercial featuring a young married couple receiving news about their first pregnancy. The commercial shows the parents going through common hardships of young parenthood, such as getting little sleep, having a toddler make a mess in the house, etc. Toward the end of the commercial, the father closes his eyes and takes a long drink from a Coca-Cola Life bottle. He opens his eyes, and while still drinking, his wife shows him a "positive" pregnancy test result. What appears to be a look of horror on the father's face (his eyes widen) turns into a look of joy and excitement.

=== Armenia ===
In Armenia, Coca-Cola Life was exclusively available in SAS supermarket. One can of 330 ml costs around one U.S. dollar.

=== Malaysia ===
Introduced January 2018, it was only available in 500 ml quantities (as of January 2018). The product was sold for RM2 or roughly US$0.50 per bottle at 7-Eleven.

== Criticism ==
Critics denoted Coca-Cola Life as simply a marketing gimmick or "greenwashing" of its outdated image with the original Coca-Cola drink.

== See also ==
- Pepsi True
- Pepsi Raw/Pepsi Natural
