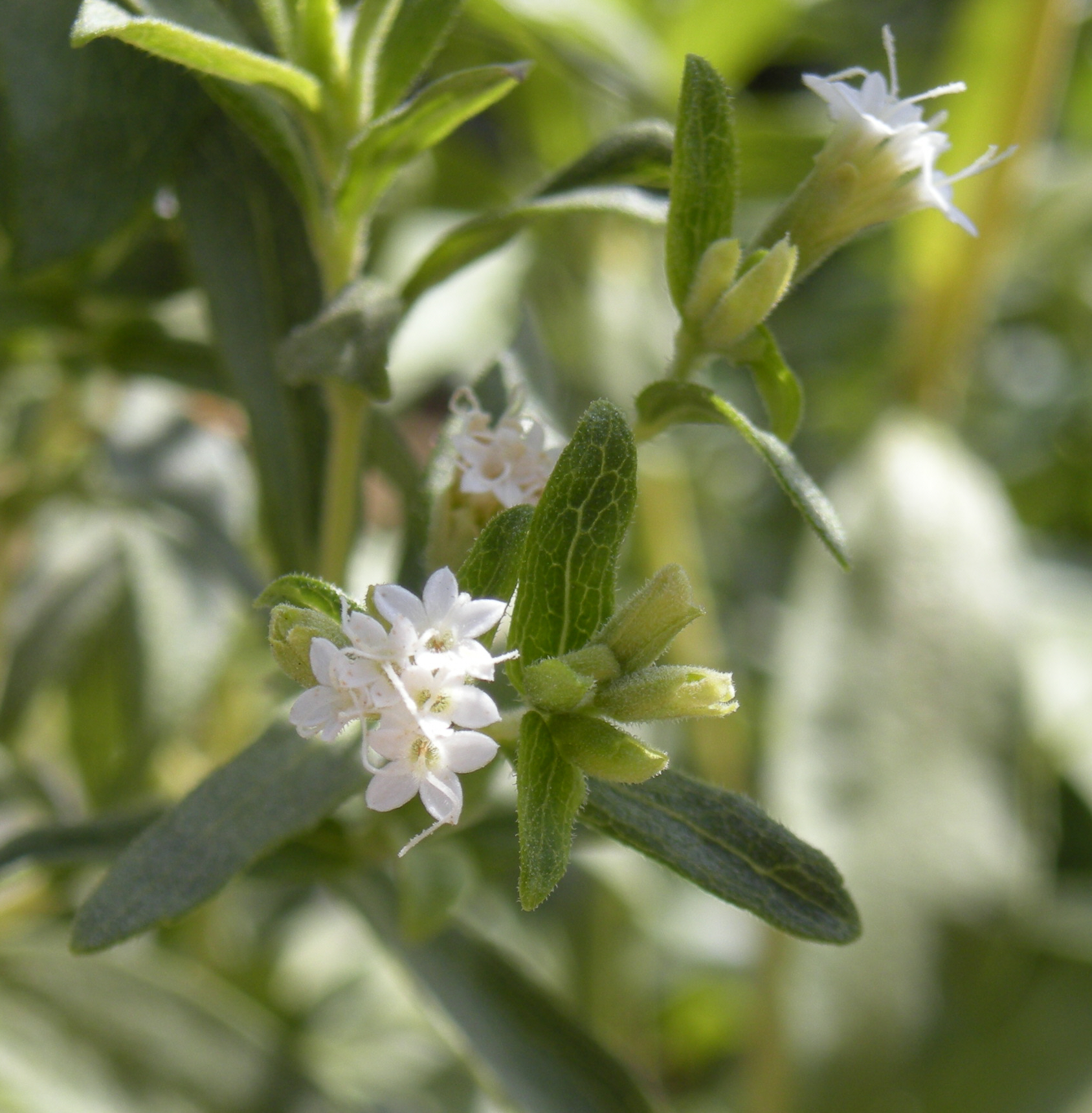
- Stevia rebaudiana flowers

Scientific classification
- Kingdom: Plantae
- Clade: Tracheophytes
- Clade: Angiosperms
- Clade: Eudicots
- Clade: Asterids
- Order: Asterales
- Family: Asteraceae
- Genus: Stevia
- Species: S. rebaudiana

Binomial name
- Stevia rebaudiana (Bertoni) Bertoni

= Stevia rebaudiana =

Species of flowering plant

Stevia rebaudiana is a plant species in the genus Stevia of the family Asteraceae. It is commonly known as candyleaf, sweetleaf or sugarleaf.

It is a small seasonal plant which grows to a height of 30–60 centimetres (1–2 feet). It has elongated leaves that grow along the stems and are lined up against each other. The flowers are typically trimmed to improve the taste of the leaves. Stevia is a tender perennial native to parts of Brazil and Paraguay having humid, wet environments.

Stevia is widely grown for its leaves, from which extracts can be manufactured as sweetener products known generically as stevia and sold under various trade names. The chemical compounds that produce its sweetness are various steviol glycosides (mainly stevioside and rebaudioside), which have 200–300 times the sweetness of sugar. Stevia leaves contain 9.1% stevioside and 3.8% rebaudioside A.

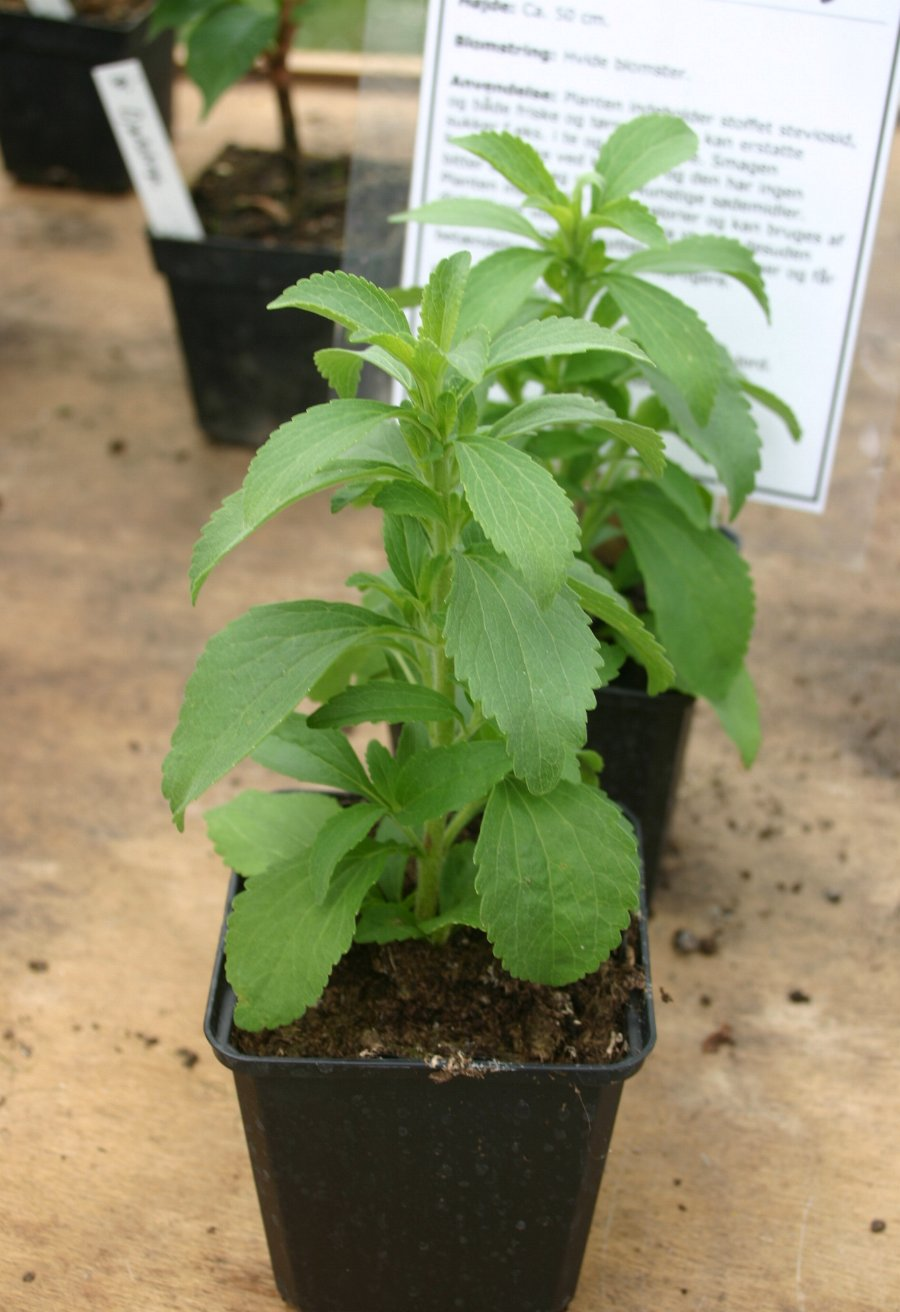
Stevia rebaudiana

== Description ==
Stevia rebaudiana is a perennial herb growing up to 2 ft (0.61 m) tall. The flowers are white with light purple accents and no fragrance. Plants produce fruit which is ribbed spindle-shaped. Stevia prefers sandy soil.

=== Chemistry ===
In 1931, chemists isolated the glycosides stevioside and rebaudioside that give the leaves their sweet taste. The exact structures of the aglycone steviol and its glycosides were published in 1955.

== Cultivation ==
Beginning in the 1960s, commercial cultivation had spread to Japan, Southeast Asia and the US, but also in mildly tropical climates in hilly areas of Nepal or India (Assam region). The plant prefers warm, moist and sunny conditions. The plant cannot survive frost during the winter and therefore greenhouses are used to grow stevia in Europe.

Stevia rebaudiana is found in the wild in semiarid habitats ranging from grassland to mountain terrain, does produce seeds, but only a small percentage of the seeds germinate.

Stevia rebaudiana has been grown on an experimental basis in Ontario, Canada, since 1987 to determine the feasibility of commercial cultivation. Duke University researchers developed a strategic plan to assist farmers and exporters in Paraguay to compete in the global market for stevia.

== Uses ==
Stevia rebaudiana has been used for centuries by the Guaraní people of Brazil and Paraguay, who called it ka'a he'ẽ ("sweet herb"), to sweeten the local yerba mate tea, as medicine, and as a "sweet treat". Rural and indigenous populations in Paraguay also used the plant as a contraceptive.

In 1899, botanist Moisés Santiago Bertoni first described the plant as growing in eastern Paraguay, and observed its sweet taste.

When extracts of its leaves are processed into a powder, stevia is used as a sugar substitute in most of the developed world.

Based on the JECFA (Joint Expert Committee on Food Additives) declaration, safe consumption of steviol glycosides for humans is determined to be 4 mg/kg body weight per day. It was also agreed by the European Commission in 2011 for use in food in European countries. Steviol glycosides have also been accepted in the US as generally recognized as safe (GRAS).

Stevia leaf and raw extracts are not treated as GRAS and their import into the US is not allowed for use as sweeteners.
