= Steviol glycoside =

Sweet chemicals derived from the Stevia plant

Molecular structure of stevioside

Steviol glycosides are the chemical compounds responsible for the sweet taste of the leaves of the South American plant Stevia rebaudiana (Asteraceae) and the main ingredients (or precursors) of many sweeteners marketed under the generic name stevia and several trade names. They also occur in the related species S. phlebophylla (but in no other species of Stevia) and in the plant Rubus chingii (Rosaceae).

Steviol glycosides from Stevia rebaudiana have been reported to be between 30 and 320 times sweeter than sucrose, although there is some disagreement in the technical literature about these numbers. They are heat-stable, pH-stable, and do not ferment.

Steviol glycosides do not induce a glycemic response when ingested, because humans cannot metabolize stevia. The acceptable daily intake (ADI) for steviol glycosides, expressed as steviol equivalents, has been established to be 4 mg/kg body weight/day, and is based on no observed adverse effects of a 100 fold higher dose in a rat study.

== Structure ==
Molecular structure of steviol, showing the substituted hydrogens on the carboxyl group (bottom) and the hydroxyl group (top)

These compounds are glycosides of steviol. Specifically, their molecules can be viewed as a steviol molecule, with its carboxyl hydrogen atom replaced by a glucose molecule to form an ester, and a hydroxyl hydrogen with combinations of glucose and rhamnose to form an acetal.

The steviol glycosides found in S. rebaudiana leaves, and their dry weight percentage, include:

- Stevioside (5–10%)
- Dulcoside A (0.5–1%)
- Rebaudioside A (2–4%)
- Rebaudioside B
- Rebaudioside C (1–2%)
- Rebaudioside D
- Rebaudioside E
- Rebaudioside F
- Rubusoside
- Steviolbioside

The last three are present only in minute quantities, and rebaudioside B has been claimed to be a byproduct of the isolation technique. A commercial steviol glycoside mixture extracted from the plant was found to have about 80% stevioside, 8% rebaudioside A, and 0.6% rebaudioside C.

The Chinese plant Rubus chingii produces rubusoside, a steviol glycoside not found in Stevia. According to the EU Stevia Regulation of 13 July 2021, however, rubusoside is one of the eleven major glycoside components of Stevia, extracted from the leaves of the Stevia rebaudiana.

Stevioside and rebaudioside A were first isolated in 1931 by French chemists, Bridel and Lavielle. Both compounds have only glucose subgroups: stevioside has two linked glucose molecules at the hydroxyl site, whereas rebaudioside A has three, with the middle glucose of the triplet connected to the central steviol structure.

Early sensory tests led to claims that rebaudioside A was 150 to 320 times sweeter than sucrose, stevioside was 110 to 270 times sweeter, rebaudioside C 40 to 60 times sweeter, and dulcoside A 30 times sweeter. However, a more recent evaluation found rebaudoside A to be about 240 times sweeter, and stevioside about 140 times. Rebaudioside A also had the least bitterness and aftertaste. The relative sweetness seems to vary with concentration: a mix of steviol glycosides in the natural proportions was found to be 150 times sweeter than sucrose when matching a 3% sucrose solution, but only 100 times sweeter when matching a 10% sucrose solution.

== Biosynthesis ==
In Stevia rebaudiana, the biosynthesis of the glucosides occurs only in green tissues. Steviol is first produced in the plastids and in the endoplasmic reticulum is glucosylated and glycosylated in the cytoplasm, catalyzed by UDP-glucosyltransferases. Rebaudioside A, in particular, is formed from stevioside.

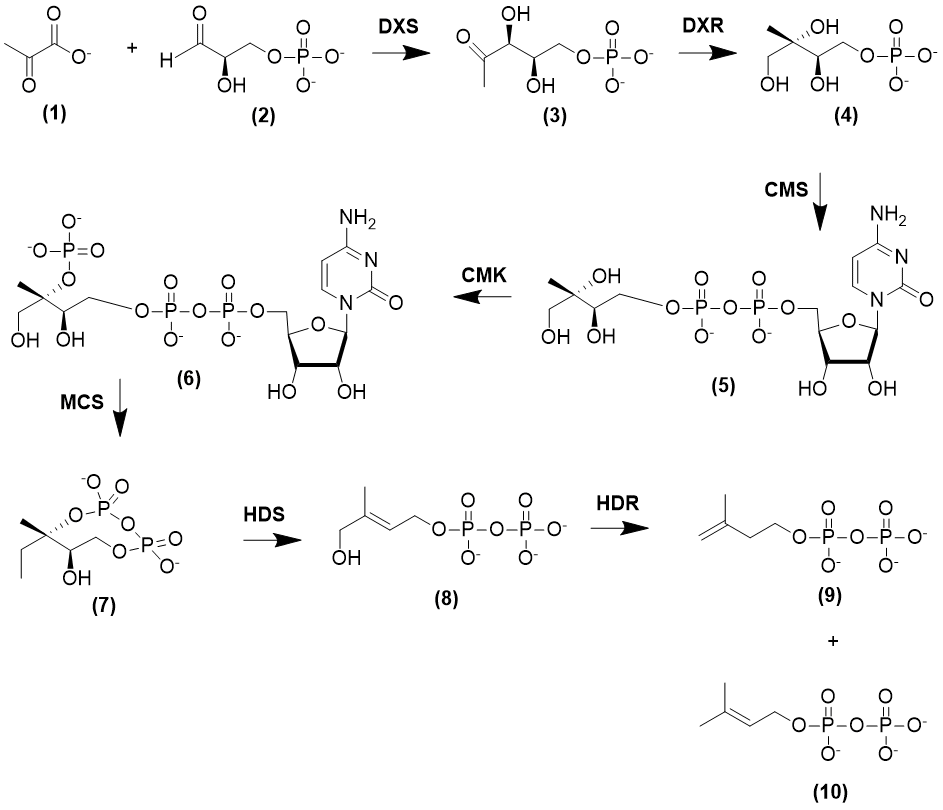
Formation of IPP and DMAPP from Pyruvate and Glyceraldehyde 3-Phosphate

Though there are several molecules that fall into the category of steviol glycoside, synthesis follows a similar route. Synthesis of steviol glycoside begins with isoprene units created via the DXP or MEP pathway. Two molecules derived from primary metabolism, Pyruvate and Glyceraldehyde 3-Phosphate, are the initial molecules for this pathway.

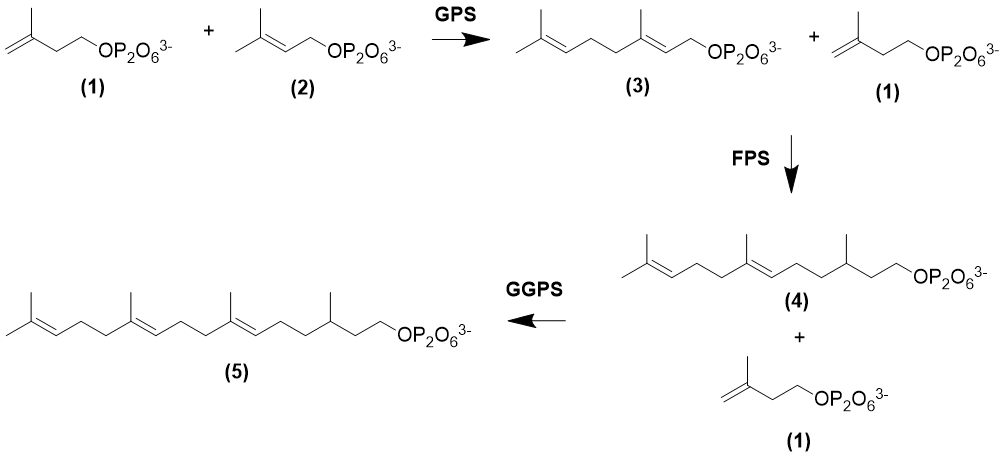
Elongation to GGPP from IPP and DMAPP

Upon forming IPP and DMAPP, the diterpene GGPP is formed by via head-to-tail addition by an Sn1 mechanism. Elongation begins when IPP and DMAPP form Geranyl Pyrophosphate (GPP). GPP elongates through the same Sn1 mechanism to create Farnesyl Pyrophosphate (FPP), and FPP elongates to form GGPP.

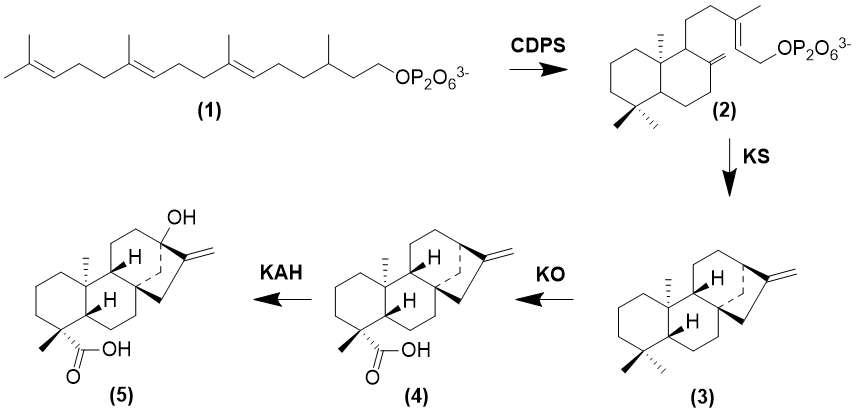
Formation of Steviol

With the formation of GGPP cyclization occurs by enzymes copalyl diphosphate synthase (CDPS) and Kuarene Synthase (KS) to form -(-)Kuarene. Several oxidation steps then occur to form steviol.

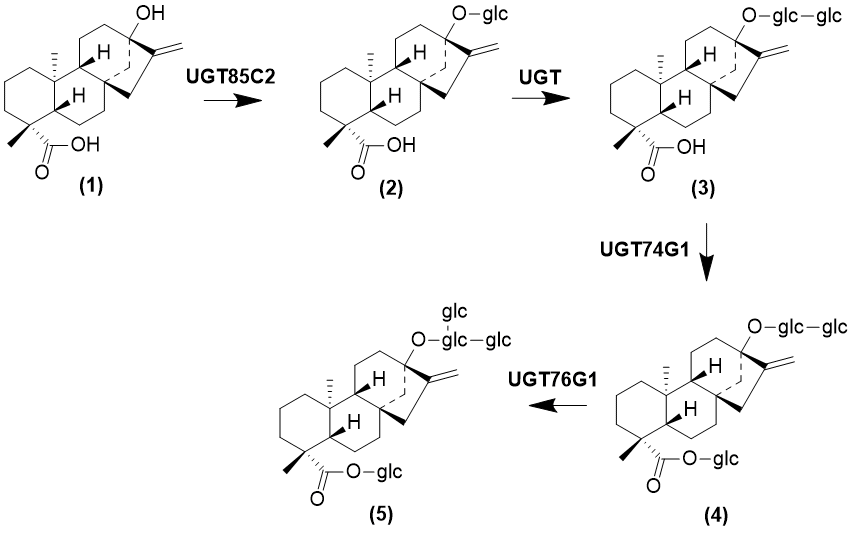
Rebaudioside A from Steviol

Steviol glycoside biosynthesis then follows several modifications from steviol that regioselectively select for sugar molecules to be placed. Once these molecules are fully glycosylated, the glycosides are then stored in vacuoles.

== See also ==
- Glycoside
- Stevia
- Sugar substitute
