= Benjamin Eisenstadt =

American inventor and entrepreneur (1906–1996)

- Born: December 7, 1906; New York City
- Died: April 8, 1996 (aged 89); New York City
- Occupation: Inventor
- Spouse: Betty Gellman (m. 1931)
- Children: 4

Benjamin Eisenstadt (December 7, 1906 – April 8, 1996) was the designer of the modern sugar packet and developer of Sweet'N Low. He was the founder of the Cumberland Packing Corporation and a notable philanthropist.

== Personal life ==
Benjamin Eisenstadt was born in New York City on December 7, 1906 in a family of Jewish immigrants from the Russian Empire. He attended Brooklyn College.

He married Betty Gellman (1910–2001) on October 27, 1931 while living at 1250 44th Street in Brooklyn. Their children were Marvin Eisenstadt, who married Barbara; Gladys Eisenstadt; Ira Eisenstadt, who married Deirdre Howley; and Ellen Eisenstadt, who married Herbert Cohen.

== Business and philanthropy ==
After college, Eisenstadt operated a cafeteria across from the Brooklyn Navy Yard. He switched to making tea bags after his cafeteria business declined.

In the mid 1940s he invented the sugar packet, packaged single servings of table sugar, to utilize his tea bag machinery. He proposed the idea to the major sugar producers, but was unsuccessful in attracting their interest. Since he had not secured a patent before shopping the idea around, sugar producers were then free to use his idea without paying royalties, and they did so.

In 1957 he came up with a formula for a powdered saccharin sweetener. Previously saccharin was sold as liquid drops, or tiny tablets. He mixed the saccharin with dextrose to bulk it up to a teaspoon sized portion, added cream of tartar, and calcium silicate as anti-caking agents. His Cumberland Packing Corporation marketed the product, called Sweet'N Low, in bright pink packets so that the saccharin packets would not be confused with sugar packets at restaurants.

His company was also the first to package soy sauce and other single serving condiments.

After the Cumberland Packing Corporation was on a financially successful footing, Eisenstadt devoted a part of his wealth to medical philanthropy. He became chairman of the board of the foundation for Maimonides Medical Center. During his 20-year tenure as a trustee and benefactor of this institution, he also served as secretary, and vice chairman of the board.

== Death ==
Benjamin died at age 89 after complications from open heart surgery.

== Legacy ==
Maimonides Medical Center has the Eisenstadt Administration Building and the Gellman Pavilion. The Gellman Pavilion was named in memory of Dr. Abraham Gellman, the brother of Eisenstadt's wife Betty.

== Patent ==
- U.S. patent 3,625,711
