= Cumberland Packing Corporation =

American food company

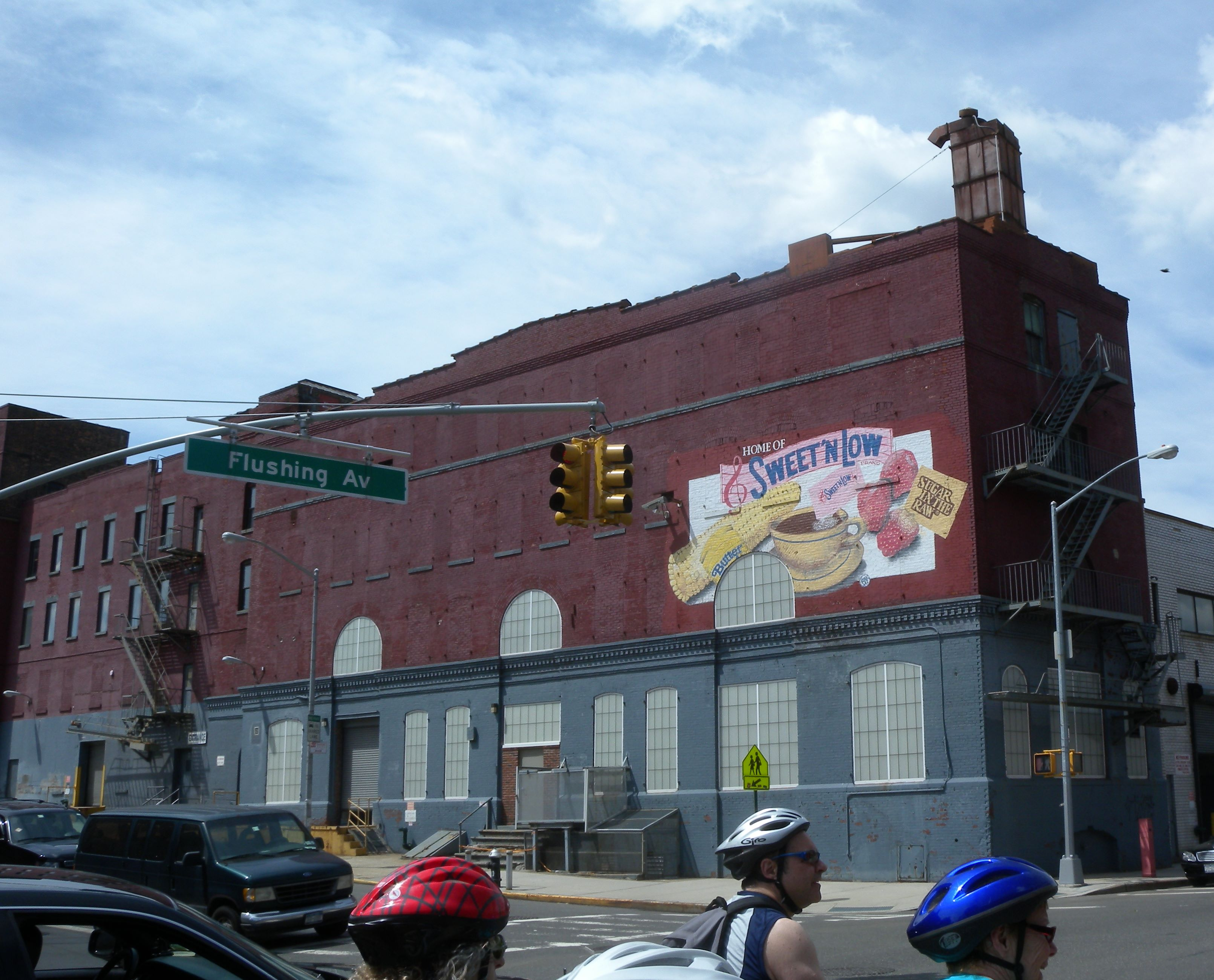
- Cumberland Packing factory in Cumberland Street, Brooklyn
- Company type: Privately held company
- Industry: Food processing
- Founded: 1945; 80 years ago
- Founder: Benjamin Eisenstadt
- Headquarters: New York City, United States
- Area served: Worldwide
- Key people: Marvin Eisenstadt
- Products: Sugar; sugar substitutes; salt substitutes; sweeteners
- Website: cpack.com

Cumberland Packing Corporation is an American company that produces sweeteners and other food condiment packets. It is based in Brooklyn, New York City. It was founded in 1945 by Benjamin Eisenstadt and is best known as the manufacturer, distributor, and marketer of Sweet'N Low, a saccharin-based zero-calorie sweetener sold in pink packets.

== History ==
Cumberland Packing began in 1945 as a tea bag factory prior to the invention of Sweet'N Low. Using modified tea bagging equipment, the company was the first to sell sugar in packets, breaking tradition with sugar bowls that were common on restaurant tabletops at the time.

The company received Federal Trademark Registration Number 1,000,000 for the Sweet'N Low musical scale logo. There have been over 500 billion Sweet'N Low packets produced.

In the early 1970s, Ben Eisenstadt's son, Marvin Eisenstadt, launched the Sugar in the Raw brand. Cumberland has expanded its In the Raw line of natural products to include Stevia in the Raw, a zero-calorie stevia-based sweetener; Agave in the Raw, a 100% organic agave nectar; and Monk Fruit in the Raw, a zero-calorie sweetener made from the vine-ripened monk fruit. In 2014, the company launched an eco-friendly baking alternative to refined white sugar with Sugar in the Raw Organic White.

In the late 1970s, Cumberland Packing Corp. bought the rights to concentrated dairy-flavor formulas called Butter Buds, and added the Butter Buds Food Ingredients division, producing all-natural, fat- and cholesterol-free butter-flavored granules. On January 1, 2013, the company completed an internal corporate reorganization, whereby the Butter Buds Food Ingredients Division became separately incorporated as Butter Buds, Inc. As a result, Cumberland Packing Corp. and Butter Buds, Inc. are now part of the Cumberland Worldwide Holdings, Inc. affiliated group.

Cumberland Packing produces other tabletop sweeteners, including NatraTaste, an aspartame-based zero-calorie sweetener; NatraTaste Gold, a sucralose-based zero-calorie sweetener; and Sweet One, a zero-calorie sweetener made with acesulfame potassium. In addition to sweetener products, Cumberland Packing produces a sodium-free salt substitute, known as Nu-Salt.
