= Sweet'n Low =

Brand of artificial sweetener

Mural on the side of the Cumberland Packing Corporation, designed and painted by Benjamin Kile

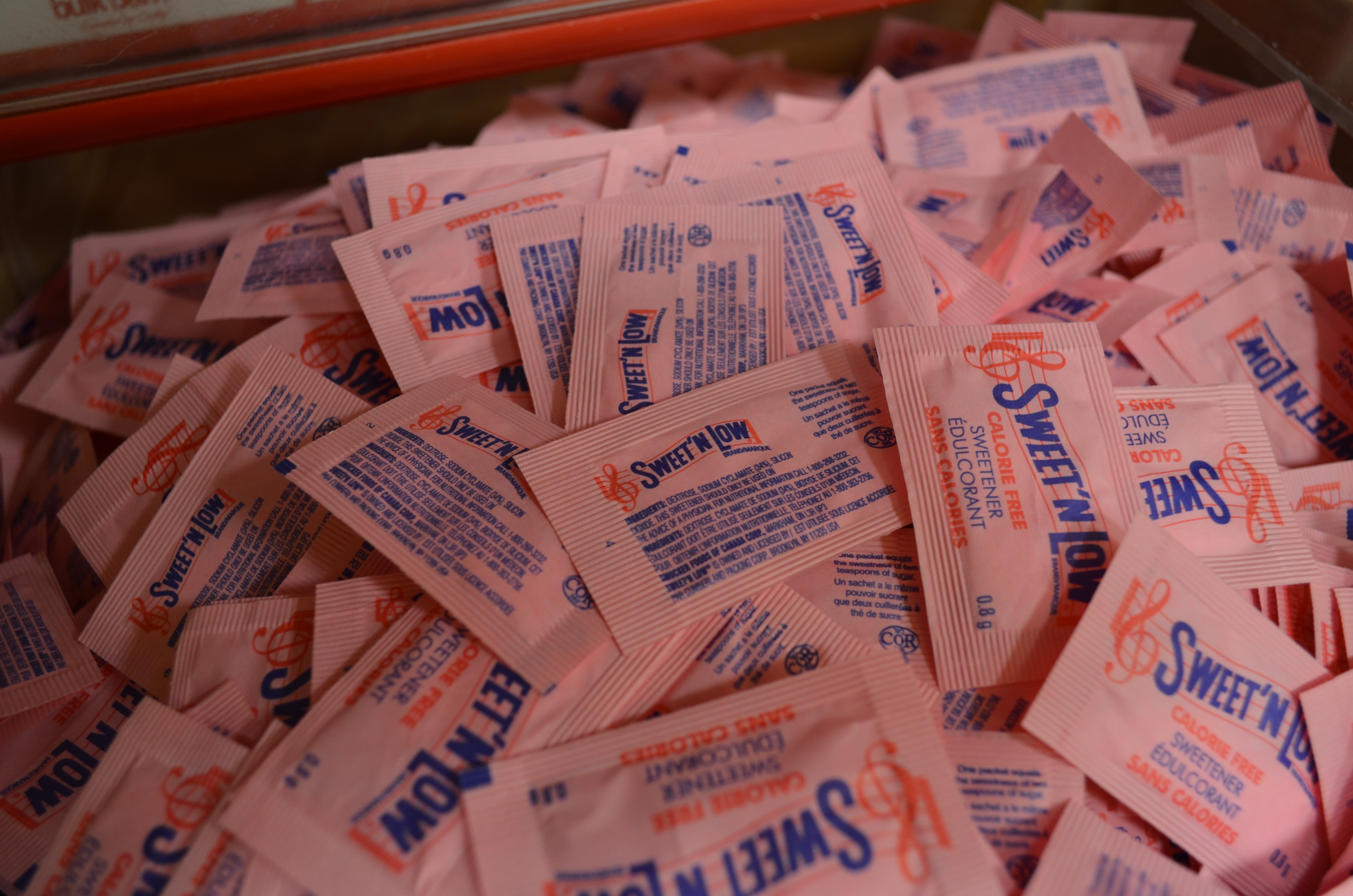
Sweet'n Low packets, showing Canadian cyclamate-based formulation

Sweet'n Low (stylized as Sweet'N Low) is a brand of artificial sweetener now made primarily from granulated saccharin (except in Canada, where it contains cyclamate instead). When introduced in 1957 in the United States, Sweet'N Low was cyclamate-based, but it was replaced by a saccharin-based formulation in 1969. It is also a brand name applied to a family of sweetener and sweetened products, some containing sweeteners other than saccharin or cyclamate. There have been over 500 billion Sweet'N Low packets produced.

Sweet'N Low is manufactured and distributed in the United States by Cumberland Packing Corporation, which also produces Sugar In The Raw and Stevia In The Raw, and in the United Kingdom by Dietary Foods Ltd. Sweet'N Low has been licensed to Bernard Food Industries for a line of low-calorie baking mixes. Its patent is U.S. patent 3,625,711.

== History ==
Saccharin was discovered in 1878 by Constantin Fahlberg, a chemist working on coal tar derivatives at the Johns Hopkins University. Although saccharin was commercialized not long after its discovery, it was not until decades later that its use became widespread. Sweet'N Low was first introduced in 1957 by Benjamin Eisenstadt, formerly proprietor of a Brooklyn Navy Yard cafeteria, and his son, Marvin Eisenstadt. The elder Eisenstadt had earlier invented the sugar packet, but did not patent it, and artificial sweetener packets were an outgrowth of that business. The two were the first to market and distribute the sugar substitute in powdered form. Their distribution company, Cumberland Packing Corporation, still controls the product.

The business is still based on the site of Ben's original diner, but no longer produces or packages the product there. Since 1957, the company operated a Sweet'N Low manufacturing and packing plant in Brooklyn, but the company announced in 2016 that it would close that operation, and shift those functions elsewhere in the United States. At the end, the plant employed 300 unionized manufacturing staff and still used antique equipment.

== Branding and advertising ==
The name "Sweet'N Low" derives from an 1863 song by Joseph Barnby, which took both its title and lyrics from an Alfred Tennyson poem, entitled The Princess: Sweet and Low. The product's name and musical staff logo have US trademark registration number 3,317,421.

Around 2005, Cumberland Packing Corporation made a sponsorship deal with Metro Goldwyn Mayer related to the 2006 film The Pink Panther. As a result, the Pink Panther animated character made an appearance on the sweetener's pink packaging and television commercials.

By 2010, the cartoon panther had been replaced by a motif reminiscent of the 1960s and 1970s (which their newly hired advertising agency, Mother, believed had returned to fashion in the 2010s), in an effort to broaden the brand's appeal to customers outside of its traditional demographic of women aged 45 and older. The agency felt that previous advertising, using Regis Philbin and the Pink Panther, borrowed the brand equity of other properties instead of claiming cultural relevance of its own.
