= Stevia =

Sweetener and sugar substitute

Stevia (/ˈstiːviə, ˈstɛviə/) is a sugar substitute that is about 50 to 300 times sweeter than sugar. It is extracted from the leaves of Stevia rebaudiana, a plant native to areas of Paraguay and Brazil. The active compounds in stevia are steviol glycosides, mainly stevioside and rebaudioside A. Some 60 different steviol glycosides have been identified in the leaves of Stevia rebaudiana.

Humans cannot metabolize the glycosides in stevia, and it therefore has zero calories. Its taste has a slower onset and longer duration than that of sugar, and at high concentrations some of its extracts may have an aftertaste described as liquorice-like or bitter. Stevia is used in sugar- and calorie-reduced food and beverage products as an alternative to variants with sugar.

The plant Stevia rebaudiana has been used for centuries by the Guaraní people of South America, who called it ka'a he'ê ("sweet herb"). The genus was named for the Spanish botanist and physician Pedro Jaime Esteve (Petrus James Stevus, 1500–1556) a professor of botany at the University of Valencia. The leaves have been used traditionally for hundreds of years in both Paraguay and Brazil to sweeten local teas, and as a "sweet treat".

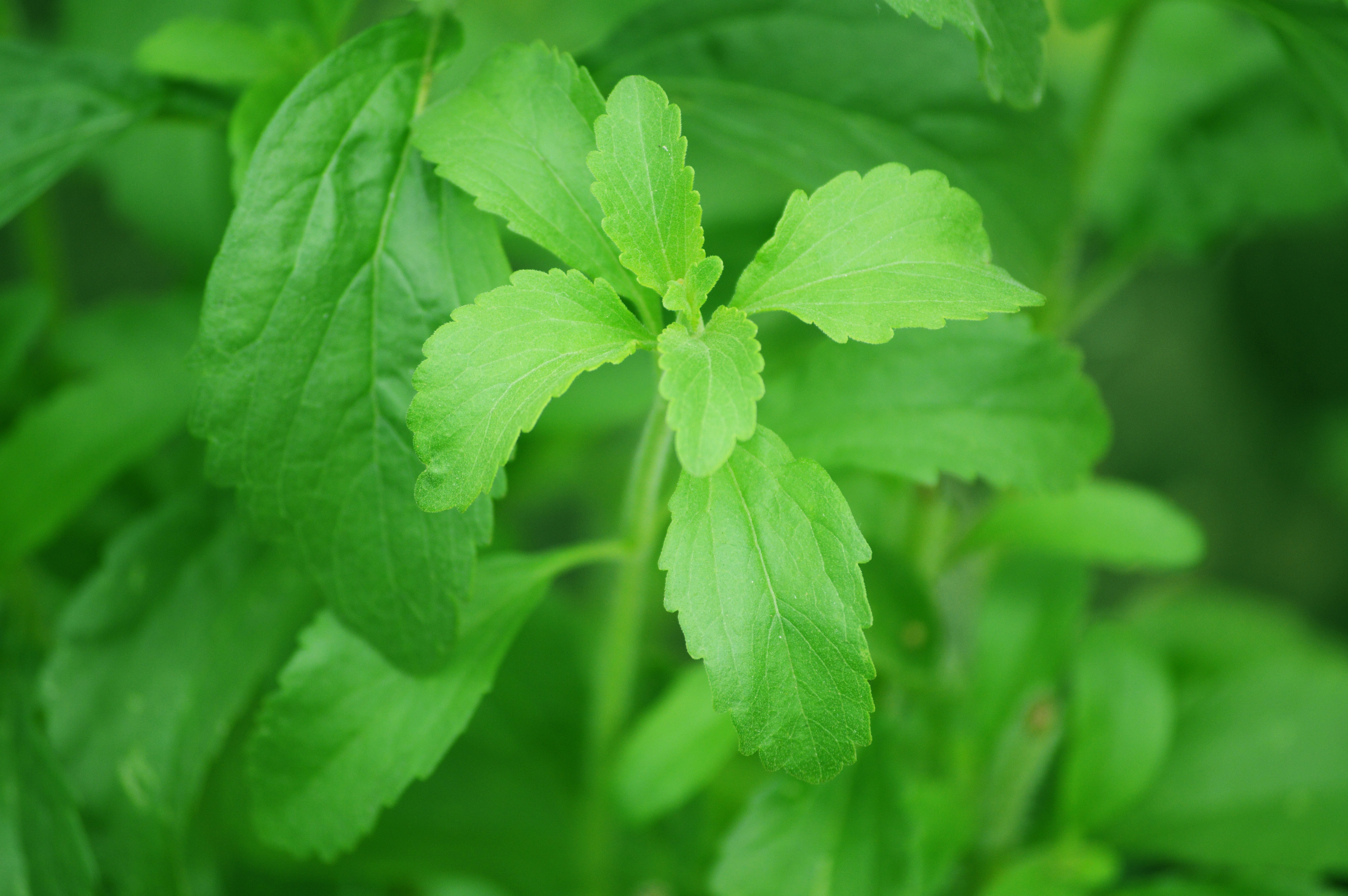
Stevia rebaudiana leaves

The legal status of stevia as a food additive or dietary supplement varies from country to country. Stevia has been widely used in Japan as a sweetener for decades. The European Union approved stevia additives in 2011. In the United States, extracts of certain high-purity steviol glycosides have been generally recognized as safe (GRAS) and may be lawfully marketed and added to food products, but stevia leaf and crude extracts do not have GRAS or Food and Drug Administration (FDA) approval for use in food.

== History ==
Swiss botanist Moisés Santiago Bertoni first described the plant and its sweet taste in detail in 1899, while conducting research in eastern Paraguay. Little research was conducted on the topic until 1931, when two French chemists isolated the glycosides that give stevia its sweet taste.

=== Regulation ===
In the early 1990s, the United States FDA denied two petitions requesting that stevia be classified as GRAS. Stevia remained banned for all uses until the Dietary Supplement Health and Education Act of 1994, after which the FDA revised its stance and permitted stevia to be used as a dietary supplement, although still not as a food additive.

In 1999, the European Commission banned stevia's use in food products within the European Union pending further research. In 2006 and 2016, research data compiled in the safety evaluations released by the World Health Organization found no adverse effects.

In December 2008, the FDA gave a "no objection" approval for GRAS status to Truvia (Note: Truvia is the brand-name of a sweetener developed by Cargill and the Coca-Cola Company.) and PureVia, (Note: PureVia is the brand-name of a sweetener developed by PepsiCo and the Whole Earth Sweetener Company (a subsidiary of Merisant).) both of which use rebaudioside A derived from the Stevia rebaudiana plant. The FDA declared that these products are not stevia, but highly purified Stevia rebaudiana extracts. In 2015, the FDA still regarded stevia as "not an approved food additive", and stated that it "has not been affirmed as GRAS in the United States due to inadequate toxicological information". In June 2016, the U.S. Customs and Border Protection issued an order of detention for stevia products produced by PureCircle in China based on information that the products were made using forced labour. As of 2017, certain high-purity steviol glycoside extracts have been GRAS in the US, and may be lawfully marketed and added to food products.

=== Commercial use ===
Use of stevia as a sweetener began in Japan, with the aqueous extract of the leaves yielding purified steviosides developed as sweeteners. Japanese firm Morita Kagaku Kogyo say they were the first in 1971 to commercialize stevia sweetener production.

In the mid-1980s, stevia was commonly used in U.S. natural foods and health food industries, as a noncaloric natural sweetener for teas and weight-loss blends. The makers of the synthetic sweetener NutraSweet (at the time Monsanto) asked the FDA to require testing of stevia extracts. In 2007, the Coca-Cola Company announced plans to obtain approval for its Stevia-derived sweetener, Rebiana, for use as a food additive within the United States by 2009, as well as plans to market Rebiana-sweetened products in 12 countries that allow stevia's use as a food additive.

In May 2008, Coca-Cola and Cargill announced the availability of Truvia, a consumer-brand Stevia sweetener containing erythritol and Rebiana, which the FDA permitted as a food additive in December 2008. Coca-Cola announced intentions to release stevia-sweetened beverages in late December 2008. From 2013 onwards, Coca-Cola Life, containing stevia as a sweetener, was launched in various countries around the world.

Shortly afterward, PepsiCo and Pure Circle announced PureVia, their brand of Stevia-based sweetener, but withheld release of beverages sweetened with rebaudioside A until receipt of FDA confirmation. Since the FDA permitted Truvia and PureVia, both the Coca-Cola Company and PepsiCo have introduced products that contain their new sweeteners.

== "Natural" claim ==
In 2012, a California resident filed a class action against Jamba Juice for allegedly falsely advertising its fruit smoothie kits as "all natural", while actually containing "unnaturally processed, synthetic and/or non-natural ingredients", such as ascorbic acid, citric acid, xanthan gum and steviol glycosides. The plaintiff argued that steviol glycosides should not be considered natural because the used extraction methods involve adding chemicals. The industry argued that the major suppliers do not use concentrated solutions of for example hexane or hydrochloric acid. In 2015, Jamba Juice settled the case, agreeing to stop describing its smoothie kits containing ascorbic acid, xanthan gum, steviol glycosides, modified corn starch, and gelatin as 'all-natural'.

In the United States, lawsuits have also been filed against other firms who use stevia in some products, including PepsiCo, Kellogg's, ConAgra and Kraft, alleging they are misleading consumers with ‘natural’ claims.

In 2013, four lawsuits were filed against Cargill for allegedly misleadingly labeling Truvia as a "natural sweetener", while containing only small amounts of Reb A, and both synthetic and chemically processed ingredients. In the Denise Howerton v. Cargill class action, it was argued that the erythritol used as a bulk sweetener is synthetically made from genetically modified corn and then fermented by a yeast and therefore not a natural product. In the consolidated class-action lawsuits, a federal judge approved a compensation of 6.1 million dollar. Cargill had to change the product labels and the information on its website. Cargill continued, however, to label Truvia as 'natural', albeit with reference to adapted information on the Truvia website and removing the comparison with "making tea" as part of the settlement.

== Industrial extracts ==
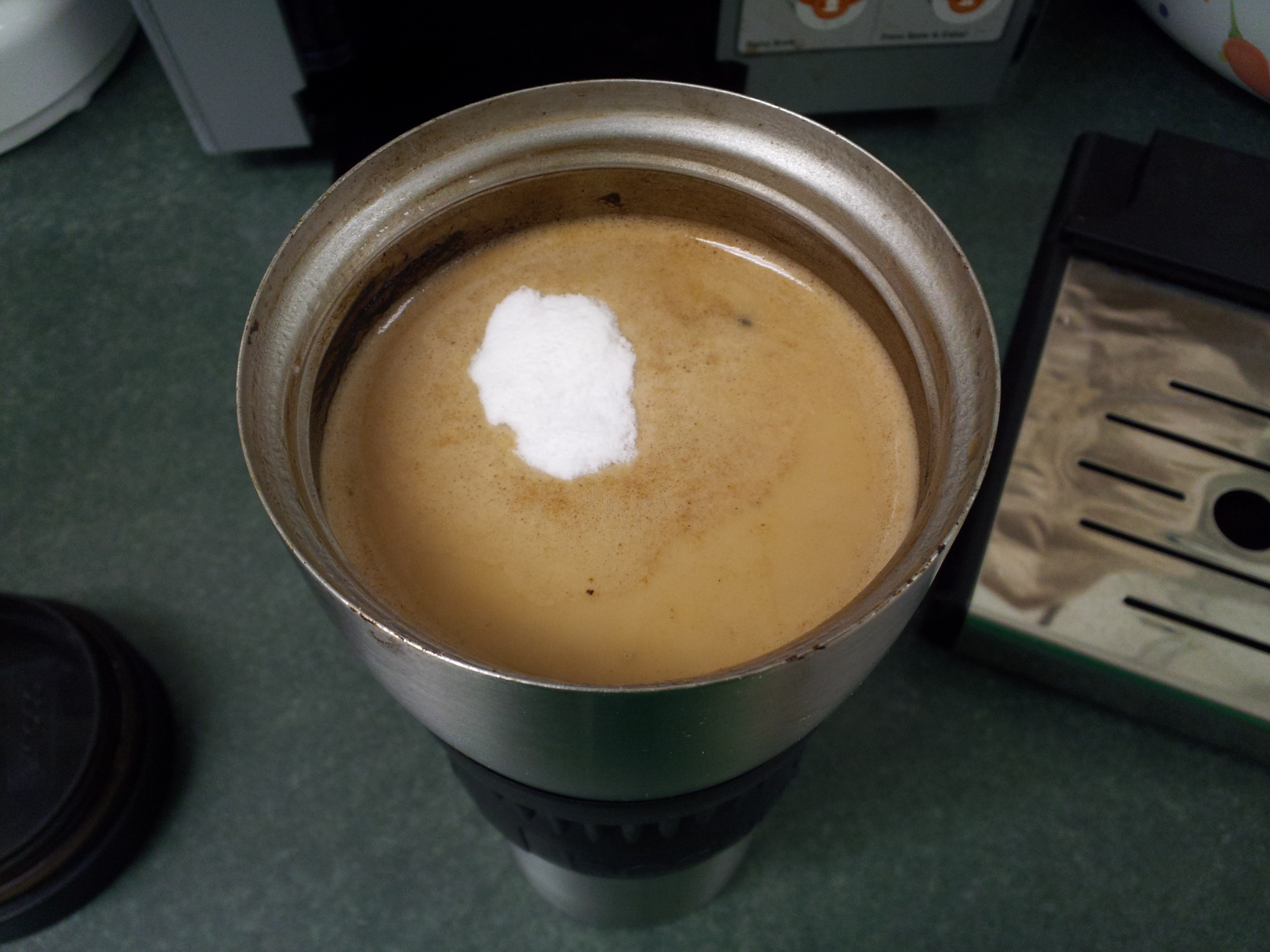
Stevia powder floating on coffee before stirring

Rebaudioside A has the least bitterness of all the steviol glycosides in the Stevia rebaudiana plant. To produce steviol glycosides commercially, Stevia rebaudiana plants are dried and subjected to a hot water extraction process, yielding a powder after drying. This crude extract contains about 50% rebaudioside A. The various glycosides are separated and purified via crystallization techniques, typically using ethanol or methanol as solvent. The dried extract as a powder contains no less than 95% steviol glycosides.

Stevia rebaudiana extracts and derivatives are produced industrially and marketed under different trade names.

- Rebiana is an abbreviated name for the Stevia extract powder, rebaudioside A.
- Truvia is the brand for an erythritol and rebiana sweetener product manufactured by Cargill and developed jointly with the Coca-Cola Company.
- PureVia is PepsiCo's brand of rebiana powder.
- EverSweet, discovered and developed by Evolva, and manufactured jointly by Cargill and DSM.

== Mechanism of action ==
Steviol, the basic building block of stevia's sweet glycosides

Glycosides are molecules that contain glucose residues bound to other non-sugar substances called aglycones (molecules with other sugars are polysaccharides). Preliminary experiments deduce that the tongue's taste receptors react to the glycosides and transduce the sweet taste sensation and the lingering bitter aftertaste by direct activation of sweet and bitter receptors.

According to basic research, steviol glycosides and steviol interact with a protein channel called TRPM5, potentiating the signal from the sweet or bitter receptors, amplifying the taste of other sweet, bitter and umami tastants. The synergetic effect of the glycosides on the sweet receptor and TRPM5 explains the sweetness sensation. Some steviol glycosides (rebaudioside A) are perceived sweeter than others (stevioside).

Steviol is processed by intestinal microflora and is also taken up into the bloodstream, further metabolised by the liver to steviol glucuronide and several other metabolites, and excreted in the urine.

Key Stevia rebaudiana proteins involved in the natural biosynthesis of steviol glucosides have been identified and the 3D structure of one of these was reported in 2019.

== Safety and regulations ==
A 2010 review found that the use of Stevia rebaudiana sweeteners as replacements for sugar might benefit children, people with diabetes, and those wishing to lower their intake of calories.

Although both steviol and rebaudioside A have been found to be mutagenic in laboratory in vitro testing, these effects have not been demonstrated for the doses and routes of administration to which humans are exposed. Two 2010 review studies found no health concerns with Stevia rebaudiana or its sweetening extracts.

The WHO's Joint Experts Committee on Food Additives has approved, based on long-term studies, an acceptable daily intake of steviol glycoside of up to 4 mg/kg of body mass. In 2010, The European Food Safety Authority established an acceptable daily intake of 4 mg/kg of steviol, in the form of steviol glycosides. Meanwhile, the Memorial Sloan Kettering Cancer Center warns that "steviol at high dosages may have weak mutagenic activity," and a review "conducted for" the Center for Science in the Public Interest notes that there are no published carcinogenicity results for rebaudioside A (or stevioside).

In August 2019, updated in May 2025, the US FDA placed an import alert on Stevia leaves and crude extracts – which do not have GRAS status – and on foods or dietary supplements containing them due to concerns about safety and potential for toxicity.

=== Availability and legal status by country or area ===
The plant may be grown legally in most countries, although some countries restrict its use as a sweetener. The legally allowed uses and maximum dosage of the extracts and derived products vary widely from country to country.

- Argentina: available as of 2008, regulatory status uncertain
- Australia:
  - All steviol glycoside extracts were approved in 2008.
- Brazil: stevioside extract approved as food additive since 2005.
- Canada (as of November 2012)
  - Steviol glycosides became available as a food additive on 30 November 2012.
  - Stevia rebaudiana leaf and extracts are available as dietary supplements.
- Chile: available as of 2008, regulatory status uncertain
- China: available since 1984, regulatory status uncertain
- Colombia: available as of 2008, regulatory status uncertain
- European Union: Steviol glycosides were approved and regulated as food additives by the European Commission on 11 November 2011.
- Hong Kong: steviol glycosides approved as food additives since January 2010
- India: In a notification dated 13 November 2015, FSSAI has permitted its use in a range of products. This includes carbonated water, dairy-based desserts and flavoured drinks, yoghurts, ready-to-eat cereals, fruit nectars and jams. (Note: Madhu-Tulsi (Sweeteners in Food Regulations; Public Health and Municipal Services Ordinance))
- Indonesia: (2012)
  - Steviol glycosides are available as food additives since 2012.
  - Stevia leaf is available as a dietary supplement.
- Israel: approved as food additive since January 2012.
- Japan: widely available since the 1970s and regulated as an existing additive since 1995.
- Korea: available as of 2008, regulatory status uncertain.
- Malaysia: available as of 2008, regulatory status uncertain.
- Mexico: mixed steviol glycoside extract (not separate extracts) approved since 2009.
- New Zealand:
  - All steviol glycoside extracts were approved in 2008.
- Norway:
  - Steviol glycoside approved as food additive (E 960) since June 2012.
  - The plant itself has not been approved as of September 2012.
- Paraguay: available as of 2008, regulatory status uncertain.
- Peru: available as of 2008, regulatory status uncertain.
- Philippines: available as of 2008, regulatory status uncertain.
- Russian Federation: stevioside approved as food additive since 2008, in the "minimal dosage required" to achieve the goal. Stevia leaves, powder, syrups and crude extracts derived from it have been banned. The ban is enacted on 27 February 2024. E960 is still approved.
- Saudi Arabia: available as of 2008, regulatory status uncertain.
- Singapore: steviol glycosides approved as food additive in certain foods, since 2005 Previously it was banned.
- South Africa: approved since September 2012 and widely available.
- Taiwan: available as of 2008, regulatory status uncertain.
- Thailand: available as of 2008, regulatory status uncertain.
- Turkey: available as of 2008, regulatory status uncertain.
- United Arab Emirates: available as of 2008, regulatory status uncertain.
- Uruguay: available as of 2008, regulatory status uncertain.
- United States (as of April 2017):
  - Purified rebaudioside A has been allowed since December 2008 as a food additive (sweetener), sold under various trade names, and classified as GRAS.
  - Stevia rebaudiana leaf and crude extracts have been available as dietary supplements since 1995, but the 2008 FDA authorization does not extend to them, and they do not have GRAS status. In 2019, leaves and crude extracts were included in an FDA import alert with concerns about their safety for use in foods or supplements and potential for toxicity.
- Vietnam: available as of 2008, regulatory status uncertain.

== See also ==
- Thaumatin, a natural sweetener, derived from an African fruit
- Miraculin, a substance that modifies the perception of sour foods into sweet
- Mogroside, a natural sweetener extracted from monkfruit
