= Rebaudioside A =

Names
- IUPAC name β-D-Glucopyranosyl 13-{β-D-glucopyranosyl-(1→2)-[β-D-glucopyranosyl-(1→3)]-β-D-glucopyranosyloxy}-5β,8α,9β,10α,13α-kaur-16-en-18-oate
- Systematic IUPAC name (2S,3R,4S,5S,6R)-3,4,5-Trihydroxy-6-(hydroxymethyl)oxan-2-yl (4R,4aS,6aR,9S,11aR,11bS)-9-{[(2S,3R,4S,5R,6R)-5-hydroxy-6-(hydroxymethyl)-3,4-bis{[(2S,3R,4S,5S,6R)-3,4,5-trihydroxy-6-(hydroxymethyl)oxan-2-yl]oxy}oxan-2-yl]oxy}-4,11b-dimethyl-8-methylidenetetradecahydro-6a,9-methanocyclohepta[a]naphthalene-4-carboxylate

Identifiers
CAS Number	58543-16-1
3D model (JSmol)	Interactive image
ChEBI	CHEBI:145012
ChEMBL	ChEMBL430341
ChemSpider	5294031
ECHA InfoCard	100.121.892
PubChem CID	124378
UNII	B3FUD0528F
CompTox Dashboard (EPA)	DTXSID8047898
- InChI: InChI=1S/C44H70O23/c1-16-10-44-8-5-23-42(2,6-4-7-43(23,3)41(59)67-39-34(58)31(55)27(51)21(14-47)63-39)24(44)9-18(17(16)11-44)60-40-36(66-38-33(57)30(54)26(50)20(13-46)62-38)35(28(52)22(15-48)64-40)65-37-32(56)29(53)25(49)19(12-45)61-37/h17-40,45-58H,1,4-15H2,2-3H3/t17?,18?,19-,20-,21-,22-,23+,24+,25-,26-,27-,28-,29+,30+,31+,32-,33-,34-,35?,36-,37+,38+,39?,40-,42-,43-,44?/m1/s1 Key: CHSPVGNDBQFQNR-VECHAMHWSA-N
- SMILES: [C@]123[C@]([C@]4([C@@]([C@](CCC4)(C)C(O[C@@H]5O[C@@H]([C@@H](O)[C@@H]([C@H]5O)O)CO)=O)(CC1)[H])C)(CC[C@@](C2)(O[C@H]6[C@H](O[C@@H]7O[C@@H]([C@@H](O)[C@@H]([C@H]7O)O)CO)[C@H]([C@H](O)[C@H](O6)CO)O[C@@H]8O[C@@H]([C@@H](O)[C@@H]([C@H]8O)O)CO)C(C3)=C)[H]

Properties
Chemical formula	C_{44}H_{70}O_{23}
Molar mass	967.01 g/mol
Appearance	white powder
- Except where otherwise noted, data are given for materials in their standard state (at 25 °C [77 °F], 100 kPa). Infobox references

Rebaudioside A, also known as Reb A, is a steviol glycoside from the leaves of Stevia rebaudiana that is 240 times sweeter than sugar. Rebaudioside A is the sweetest and most stable steviol glycoside, and is less bitter than stevioside. Stevia leaves contain 9.1% stevioside and 3.8% rebaudioside A.

The glycoside contains only glucose (to the exclusion of other commonly found monosaccharides) as its monosaccharide moieties. It contains four glucose molecules in total with the central glucose of the triplet connected to the main steviol structure at its hydroxyl group, and the remaining glucose at its carboxyl group forming an ester bond.

Besides being used directly as a natural sweetener, Rebaudioside A is also a major raw material for the increasingly popular enzymatic conversion of Rebaudioside M. In this process, the hydroxy groups at positions 2 and 3 of the beta-D-glucosyl ester moiety are both converted to the corresponding beta-D-glucoside. Reb M offers a clean, sugar-like sweetness without the bitter aftertaste associated with earlier stevia extracts.
