= Sugar substitute =

Sugarless food additive intended to provide a sweet taste

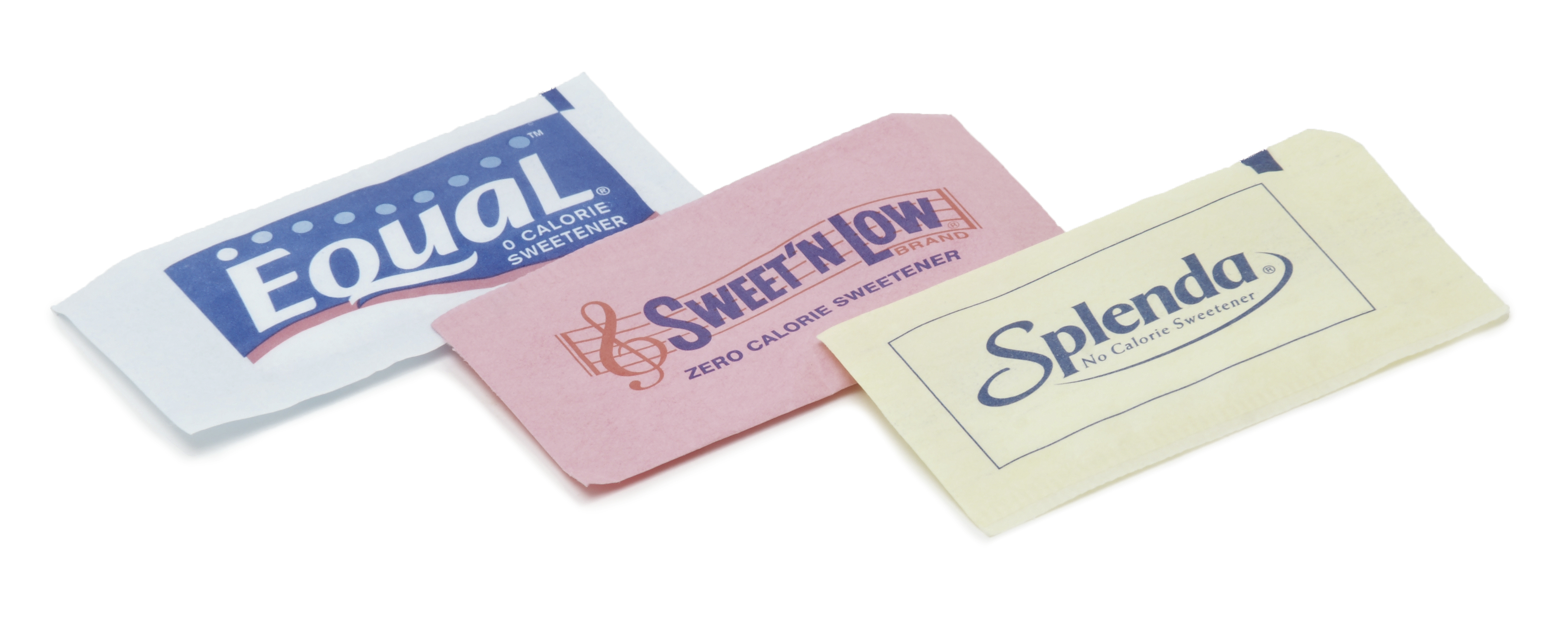
Three artificial sweeteners in paper packets, coded by color: Equal (aspartame; blue), Sweet'N Low (saccharin, pink) (Note: One U.S. brand of saccharin uses yellow packets. In Canada, cyclamate is used.) and Splenda (sucralose, yellow). Other colors used are green for stevia.

A sugar substitute or artificial sweetener is a food additive that provides a sweetness like that of sugar while containing significantly less food energy than sugar-based sweeteners, making it a zero-calorie (non-nutritive) or low-calorie sweetener. Artificial sweeteners may be derived from plant extracts or processed by chemical synthesis. Sugar substitute products are commercially available in various forms, such as small pills, powders and packets.

Common sugar substitutes include aspartame, monk fruit extract, saccharin, sucralose, stevia, acesulfame potassium (ace-K) and cyclamate. These sweeteners are a fundamental ingredient in diet drinks to sweeten them without adding calories. Additionally, sugar alcohols such as erythritol, xylitol and sorbitol are derived from sugars.

No links have been found between approved artificial sweeteners and cancer in humans. Reviews and dietetic professionals have concluded that moderate use of non-nutritive sweeteners as a relatively safe replacement for sugars that can help limit energy intake and assist with managing blood glucose and body weight.

== Types ==
Artificial sweeteners may be derived through manufacturing of plant extracts or processed by chemical synthesis.

High-intensity sweeteners, one type of sugar substitute, are compounds with many times the sweetness of sucrose (common table sugar). As a result, much less sweetener is required and energy contribution is often negligible. The sensation of sweetness caused by these compounds is sometimes notably different from sucrose, so they are often used in complex mixtures that achieve the most intense, sweet sensation.

In North America, common sugar substitutes include aspartame, monk fruit extract, saccharin, sucralose and stevia. Cyclamate is prohibited from being used as a sweetener within the United States, but is allowed in other parts of the world.

Sorbitol, xylitol and lactitol are examples of sugar alcohols (also known as polyols). These are, in general, less sweet than sucrose but have similar bulk properties and can be used in a wide range of food products. Sometimes the sweetness profile is fine-tuned by mixing with high-intensity sweeteners.

=== Allulose ===
Allulose is a sweetener in the sugar family, with a chemical structure similar to fructose. It is naturally found in figs, maple syrup and some fruit. While it comes from the same family as other sugars, it does not substantially metabolize as sugar in the body. The FDA recognizes that allulose does not act like sugar, and as of 2019, no longer requires it to be listed with sugars on U.S. nutrition labels. Allulose is about 70% as sweet as sugar, which is why it is sometimes combined with high-intensity sweeteners to make sugar substitutes.

=== Acesulfame potassium ===
Acesulfame potassium (Ace-K) is 200 times sweeter than sucrose (common sugar), as sweet as aspartame, about two-thirds as sweet as saccharin, and one-third as sweet as sucralose. Like saccharin, it has a slightly bitter aftertaste, especially at high concentrations. Kraft Foods has patented the use of sodium ferulate to mask acesulfame's aftertaste. Acesulfame potassium is often blended with other sweeteners (usually aspartame or sucralose), which give a more sucrose-like taste, whereby each sweetener masks the other's aftertaste and also exhibits a synergistic effect in which the blend is sweeter than its components.

Unlike aspartame, acesulfame potassium is stable under heat, even under moderately acidic or basic conditions, allowing it to be used as a food additive in baking or in products that require a long shelf life. In carbonated drinks, it is almost always used in conjunction with another sweetener, such as aspartame or sucralose. It is also used as a sweetener in protein shakes and pharmaceutical products, especially chewable and liquid medications, where it can make the active ingredients more palatable.

=== Aspartame ===
Aspartame was discovered in 1965 by James M. Schlatter at the G.D. Searle company. He was working on an anti-ulcer drug and accidentally spilled some aspartame on his hand. When he licked his finger, he noticed that it had a sweet taste. Torunn Atteraas Garin oversaw the development of aspartame as an artificial sweetener. It is an odorless, white crystalline powder that is derived from the two amino acids aspartic acid and phenylalanine. It is about 180–200 times sweeter than sugar, and can be used as a tabletop sweetener or in frozen desserts, gelatins, beverages and chewing gum. When cooked or stored at high temperatures, aspartame breaks down into its constituent amino acids. This makes aspartame undesirable as a baking sweetener. It is more stable in somewhat acidic conditions, such as in soft drinks. Though it does not have a bitter aftertaste like saccharin, it may not taste exactly like sugar. When eaten, aspartame is metabolized into its original amino acids. Because it is so intensely sweet, relatively little of it is needed to sweeten a food product, and is thus useful for reducing the number of calories in a product.

The safety of aspartame has been studied extensively since its discovery with research that includes animal studies, clinical and epidemiological research, and postmarketing surveillance, with aspartame being a rigorously tested food ingredient. Although aspartame has been subject to claims against its safety, multiple authoritative reviews have found it to be safe for consumption at typical levels used in food manufacturing. Aspartame has been deemed safe for human consumption by over 100 regulatory agencies in their respective countries, including the UK Food Standards Agency, the European Food Safety Authority (EFSA) and Health Canada.

=== Cyclamate ===
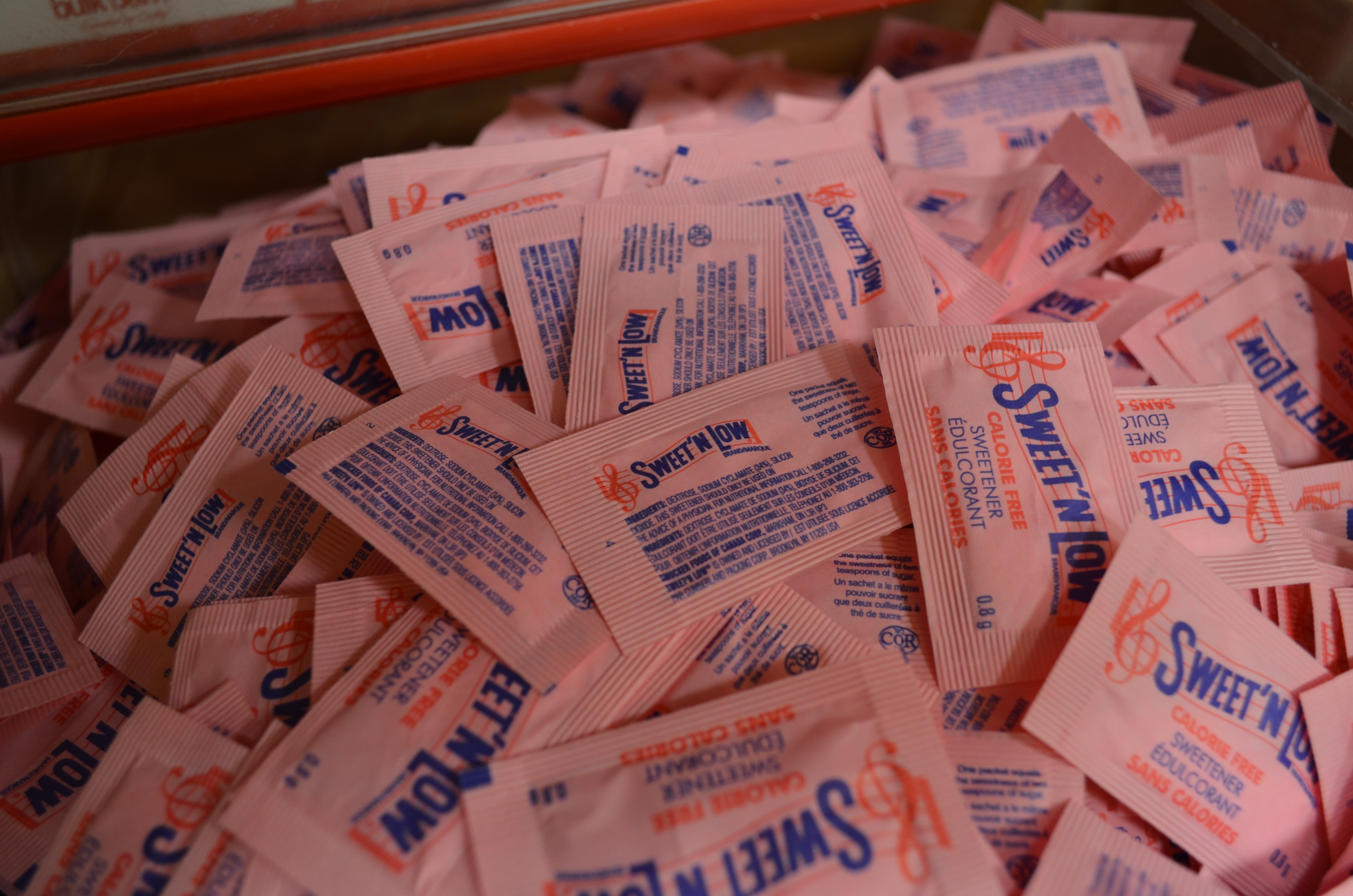
Cyclamate-based sugar substitute sold in Canada (Sweet'N Low)

In the United States, the Food and Drug Administration banned the sale of cyclamate in 1969 after lab tests in rats involving a 10:1 mixture of cyclamate and saccharin (at levels comparable to humans ingesting 550 cans of diet soda per day) caused bladder cancer. This information, however, is regarded as "weak" evidence of carcinogenic activity, and cyclamate remains in common use in many parts of the world, including Canada, the European Union and Russia.

=== Mogrosides (monk fruit) ===
Mogrosides, extracted from monk fruit (which is commonly also called luǒ hán guò), are recognized as safe for human consumption and are used in commercial products worldwide. As of 2017, it is not a permitted sweetener in the European Union, although it is allowed as a flavor at concentrations where it does not function as a sweetener. In 2017, a Chinese company requested a scientific review of its mogroside product by the European Food Safety Authority. It is the basis of McNeil Nutritionals' tabletop sweetener Nectresse in the United States and Norbu Sweetener in Australia.

=== Saccharin ===
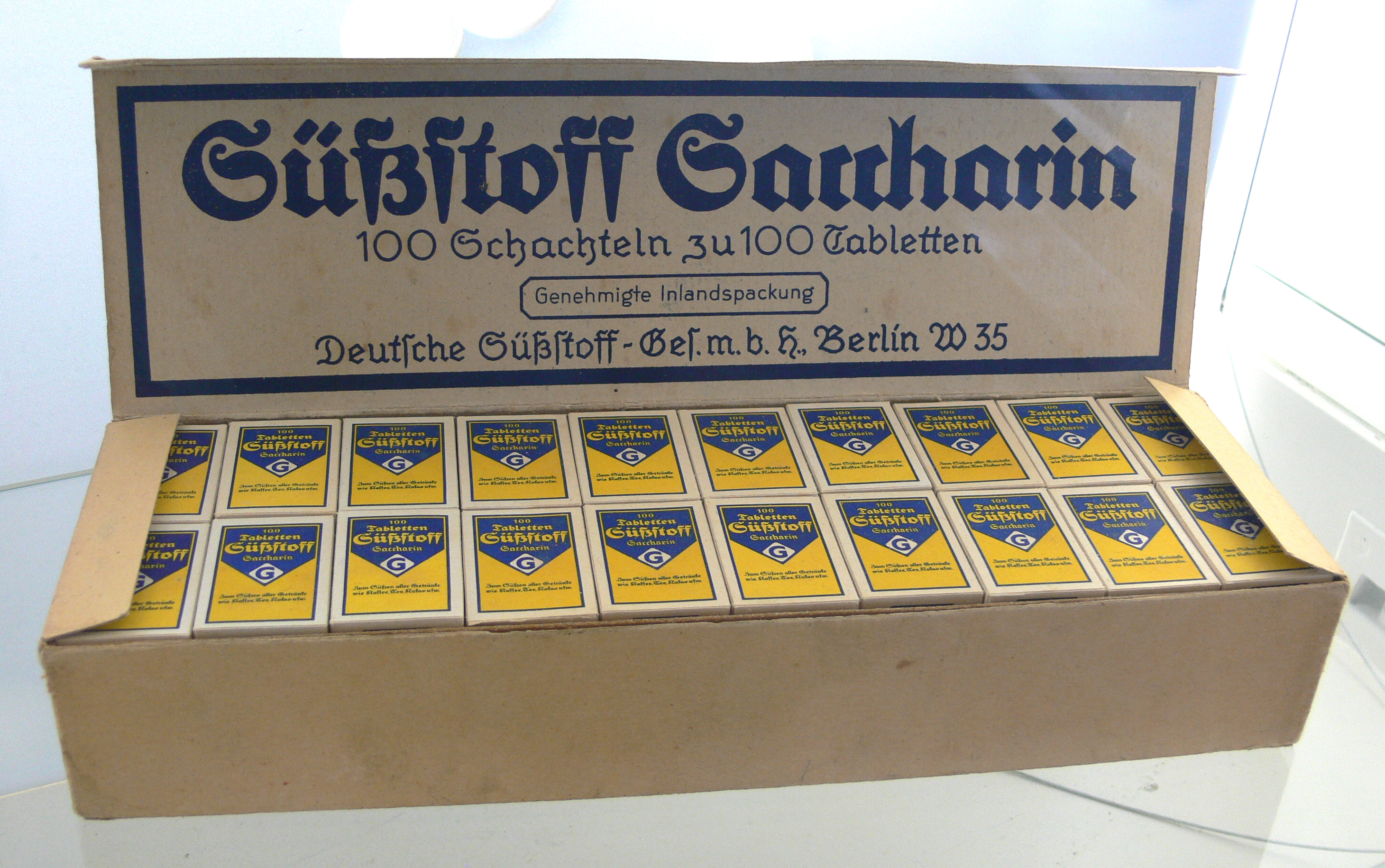
Saccharin, historical wrapping – Sugar Museum, Berlin

Apart from sugar of lead (used as a sweetener in ancient through medieval times before the toxicity of lead was known), saccharin was the first artificial sweetener and was originally synthesized in 1879 by Remsen and Fahlberg. Its sweet taste was discovered by accident. It had been created in an experiment with toluene derivatives. A process for the creation of saccharin from phthalic anhydride was developed in 1950, and, currently, saccharin is created by this process as well as the original process by which it was discovered. It is 300 to 500 times sweeter than sucrose and is often used to improve the taste of toothpastes, dietary foods and dietary beverages. The bitter aftertaste of saccharin is often minimized by blending it with other sweeteners.

Fear about saccharin increased when a 1960 study showed that high levels of saccharin may cause bladder cancer in laboratory rats. In 1977, Canada banned saccharin as a result of the animal research. In the United States, the FDA considered banning saccharin in 1977, but Congress stepped in and placed a moratorium on such a ban. The moratorium required a warning label and also mandated further study of saccharin safety.

Subsequently, it was discovered that saccharin causes cancer in male rats by a mechanism not found in humans. At high doses, saccharin causes a precipitate to form in rat urine. This precipitate damages the cells lining the bladder (urinary bladder urothelial cytotoxicity) and a tumor forms when the cells regenerate (regenerative hyperplasia). According to the International Agency for Research on Cancer, part of the World Health Organization, "This mechanism is not relevant to humans because of critical interspecies differences in urine composition".

In 2001, the United States repealed the warning label requirement, while the threat of an FDA ban had already been lifted in 1991. Most other countries also permit saccharin, but restrict the levels of use, while other countries have outright banned it.

The EPA has removed saccharin and its salts from their list of hazardous constituents and commercial chemical products. In a 14 December 2010 release, the EPA stated that saccharin is no longer considered a potential hazard to human health.

=== Steviol glycosides (stevia) ===
Stevia is a natural non-caloric sweetener derived from the Stevia rebaudiana plant, and is manufactured as a sweetener. It is indigenous to South America, and has historically been used in Japanese food products, although it is now common internationally. In 1987, the FDA issued a ban on stevia because it had not been approved as a food additive, although it continued to be available as a dietary supplement. After being provided with sufficient scientific data demonstrating safety of using stevia as a manufactured sweetener, from companies such as Cargill and Coca-Cola, the FDA gave a "no objection" status as generally recognized as safe (GRAS) in December 2008 to Cargill for its stevia product, Truvia, for use of the refined stevia extracts as a blend of rebaudioside A and erythritol. In Australia, the brand Vitarium uses Natvia, a stevia sweetener, in a range of sugar-free children's milk mixes.

In August 2019, the FDA placed an import alert on stevia leaves and crude extracts—which do not have GRAS status—and on foods or dietary supplements containing them, citing concerns about safety and potential for toxicity.

=== Sucralose ===
The world's most commonly used artificial sweetener, sucralose is a chlorinated sugar that is about 600 times sweeter than sugar. It is produced from sucrose when three chlorine atoms replace three hydroxyl groups. It is used in beverages, frozen desserts, chewing gum, baked goods and other foods. Unlike other artificial sweeteners, it is stable when heated and can therefore be used in baked and fried goods. Discovered in 1976, the FDA approved sucralose for use in 1998.

Most of the controversy surrounding Splenda, a sucralose sweetener, is focused not on safety but on its marketing. It has been marketed with the slogan, "Splenda is made from sugar, so it tastes like sugar." Sucralose is prepared from either of two sugars, sucrose or raffinose. With either base sugar, processing replaces three oxygen-hydrogen groups in the sugar molecule with three chlorine atoms. The "Truth About Splenda" website was created in 2005 by the Sugar Association, an organization representing sugar beet and sugar cane farmers in the United States, to provide its view of sucralose. In December 2004, five separate false-advertising claims were filed by the Sugar Association against Splenda manufacturers Merisant and McNeil Nutritionals for claims made about Splenda related to the slogan, "Made from sugar, so it tastes like sugar." French courts ordered the slogan to no longer be used in France, while in the U.S., the case came to an undisclosed settlement during the trial.

There are few safety concerns pertaining to sucralose and the way sucralose is metabolized suggests a reduced risk of toxicity. For example, sucralose is extremely insoluble in fat and, thus, does not accumulate in fatty tissues; sucralose also does not break down and will dechlorinate only under conditions that are not found during regular digestion (i.e., high heat applied to the powder form of the molecule). Only about 15% of sucralose is absorbed by the body and most of it passes out of the body unchanged.

In 2017, sucralose was the most common sugar substitute used in the manufacture of foods and beverages; it had 30% of the global market, which was projected to be valued at $2.8 billion by 2021.

=== Sugar alcohol ===
Sugar alcohols, or polyols, are sweetening and bulking ingredients used in the manufacturing of foods and beverages, particularly sugar-free candies, cookies and chewing gums. As a sugar substitute, they typically are less-sweet and supply fewer calories (about a half to one-third fewer calories) than sugar. They are converted to glucose slowly, and do not spike increases in blood glucose.

Sorbitol, xylitol, mannitol, erythritol and lactitol are examples of sugar alcohols. These are, in general, less sweet than sucrose, but have similar bulk properties and can be used in a wide range of food products. The sweetness profile may be altered during manufacturing by mixing with high-intensity sweeteners.

Sugar alcohols are carbohydrates with a biochemical structure partially matching the structures of sugar and alcohol, although not containing ethanol. They are not entirely metabolized by the human body. The unabsorbed sugar alcohols may cause bloating and diarrhea due to their osmotic effect, if consumed in sufficient amounts. They are found commonly in small quantities in some fruits and vegetables, and are commercially manufactured from different carbohydrates and starch.

== Use ==
=== Reasons for use ===
Sugar substitutes are used instead of sugar for a number of reasons, including:

==== Dental care ====
Carbohydrates and sugars usually adhere to the tooth enamel, where bacteria feed upon them and quickly multiply. The bacteria convert the sugar to acids that decay the teeth. Sugar substitutes, unlike sugar, do not erode teeth as they are not fermented by the microflora of the dental plaque. A sweetener that may benefit dental health is xylitol, which tends to prevent bacteria from adhering to the tooth surface, thus preventing plaque formation and eventually tooth decay. A Cochrane review, however, found only low-quality evidence that xylitol in a variety of dental products actually has any benefit in preventing tooth decay in adults and children.

==== Dietary concerns ====
Sugar substitutes are a fundamental ingredient in diet drinks to sweeten them without adding calories. Additionally, sugar alcohols such as erythritol, xylitol and sorbitol are derived from sugars. In the United States, six high-intensity sugar substitutes have been approved for use: aspartame, sucralose, neotame, acesulfame potassium (Ace-K), saccharin and advantame. Food additives must be approved by the FDA, and sweeteners must be proven as safe via submission by a manufacturer of a GRAS document. The conclusions about GRAS are based on a detailed review of a large body of information, including rigorous toxicological and clinical studies. GRAS notices exist for two plant-based, high-intensity sweeteners: steviol glycosides obtained from stevia leaves (Stevia rebaudiana) and extracts from Siraitia grosvenorii, also called luo han guo or monk fruit.

===== Glucose metabolism =====
- Diabetes mellitus – People with diabetes limit refined sugar intake to regulate their blood sugar levels. Many artificial sweeteners allow sweet-tasting food without increasing blood glucose. Others do release energy but are metabolized more slowly, preventing spikes in blood glucose. A concern, however, is that overconsumption of foods and beverages made more appealing with sugar substitutes may increase risk of developing diabetes. A 2014 systematic review showed that a 330ml/day (an amount little less than the standard U.S can size) consumption of artificially sweetened beverages lead to increased risks of type 2 diabetes. A 2015 meta-analysis of numerous clinical studies showed that habitual consumption of sugar sweetened beverages, artificially sweetened beverages, and fruit juice increased the risk of developing diabetes, although with inconsistent results and generally low quality of evidence. A 2016 review described the relationship between non-nutritive sweeteners as inconclusive. A 2020 Cochrane systematic review compared several non-nutritive sweeteners to sugar, placebo and a nutritive low-calorie sweetener (tagatose), but the results were unclear for effects on HbA1c, body weight and adverse events. The studies included were mainly of very low certainty and did not report on health-related quality of life, diabetes complications, all-cause mortality or socioeconomic effects.
- Reactive hypoglycemia – Individuals with reactive hypoglycemia will produce an excess of insulin after quickly absorbing glucose into the bloodstream. This causes their blood glucose levels to fall below the amount needed for proper body and brain function. As a result, like diabetics, they must avoid intake of high-glycemic foods like white bread, and often use artificial sweeteners for sweetness without blood glucose.

==== Cost and shelf life ====
Many sugar substitutes are cheaper than sugar in the final food formulation. Sugar substitutes are often lower in total cost because of their long shelf life and high sweetening intensity. This allows sugar substitutes to be used in products that will not perish after a short period of time.

=== Acceptable daily intake levels ===
In the United States, the FDA provides guidance for manufacturers and consumers about the daily limits for consuming high-intensity sweeteners, a measure called acceptable daily intake (ADI). During their premarket review for all of the high-intensity sweeteners approved as food additives, the FDA established an ADI defined as an amount in milligrams per kilogram of body weight per day (mg/kg bw/d), indicating that a high-intensity sweetener does not cause safety concerns if estimated daily intakes are lower than the ADI. The FDA states: "An ADI is the amount of a substance that is considered safe to consume each day over the course of a person's lifetime." For stevia (specifically, steviol glycosides), an ADI was not derived by the FDA, but by the Joint Food and Agricultural Organization/World Health Organization Expert Committee on Food Additives, whereas an ADI has not been determined for monk fruit.

For the sweeteners approved as food additives, the ADIs in milligrams per kilogram of body weight per day are:

- Acesulfame potassium, ADI 15
- Advantame, ADI 32.8
- Aspartame, ADI 50
- Neotame, ADI 0.3
- Saccharin, ADI 15
- Sucralose, ADI 5
- Stevia (pure extracted steviol glycosides), ADI 4
- Monk fruit extract, no ADI determined

=== Mouthfeel ===
If the sucrose, or other sugar, that is replaced has contributed to the texture of the product, then a bulking agent is often also needed. This may be seen in soft drinks or sweet teas that are labeled as "diet" or "light" that contain artificial sweeteners and often have notably different mouthfeel, or in table sugar replacements that mix maltodextrins with an intense sweetener to achieve satisfactory texture sensation.

== Sweetness intensity ==
The FDA has published estimates of sweetness intensity, called a multiplier of sweetness intensity (MSI) as compared to table sugar.

=== Plant-derived ===
The sweetness levels and energy densities are in comparison to those of sucrose.

Name	Relative sweetness to sucrose by weight	Sweetness by food energy	Energy density	Notes
Brazzein	1250			Protein
Curculin	1250			Protein; also changes the taste of water and sour solutions to sweet
Erythritol	0.65	14	0.05	
Fructooligosaccharide	0.4			
Glycyrrhizin	40			
Glycerol	0.6	0.55	1.075	E422
Hydrogenated starch hydrolysates	0.65	0.85	0.75	
Inulin	0.1			
Isomalt	0.55	1.1	0.5	E953
Isomaltooligosaccharide	0.5			
Isomaltulose	0.5			
Lactitol	0.4	0.8	0.5	E966
Mogroside mix	300			
Mabinlin	100			Protein
Maltitol	0.825	1.7	0.525	E965
Maltodextrin	0.15			
Mannitol	0.5	1.2	0.4	E421
Miraculin				A protein that does not taste sweet by itself but modifies taste receptors to make sour foods taste sweet temporarily
Monatin	3,000			Sweetener isolated from the plant Sclerochiton ilicifolius
Monellin	1,400			Sweetening protein in serendipity berries
Osladin	500			
Pentadin	500			Protein
Polydextrose	0.1			
Psicose	0.7			
Sorbitol	0.6	0.9	0.65	Sugar alcohol, E420
Stevia	250			Extracts known as rebiana, rebaudioside A, a steviol glycoside; commercial products: Truvia, PureVia, Stevia In The Raw
Tagatose	0.92	2.4	0.38	Monosaccharide
Thaumatin	2,000			Protein; E957
Xylitol	1.0	1.7	0.6	E967

=== Artificial ===
Name	Relative sweetness to sucrose by weight	Trade name	Approval	Notes
Acesulfame potassium	200	Nutrinova	FDA 1988	E950 Hyet Sweet
Advantame	20,000		FDA 2014	E969
Alitame	2,000		approved in Mexico, Australia, New Zealand and China	Pfizer
Aspartame	200	NutraSweet, Equal	FDA 1981, EU-wide 1994	E951 Hyet Sweet
Salt of aspartame-acesulfame	350	Twinsweet		E962
Carrelame	200,000			
Sodium cyclamate	40		FDA banned 1969, approved in EU and Canada	E952, Abbott
Dulcin	250		FDA banned 1950	
Glucin	300			
Lugduname	220,000–300,000			
Neohesperidin dihydrochalcone	1650		EU 1994	E959
Neotame	7,000–13,000	NutraSweet	FDA 2002	E961
P-4000	4,000		FDA banned 1950	
Saccharin	200–700	Sweet'N Low	FDA 1958, Canada 2014	E954
Sucralose	600	Kaltame, Splenda	Canada 1991, FDA 1998, EU 2004	E955, Tate & Lyle
Sucrononic acid	200,000			

=== Sugar alcohols ===
Sugar alcohols relative sweetness
Name	Relative sweetness to sucrose by weight	Food energy (kcal/g)	Sweetness per food energy, relative to sucrose	Food energy for equal sweetness, relative to sucrose
Arabitol	0.7	0.2	14	7.1%
Erythritol	0.8	0.21	15	6.7%
Glycerol	0.6	4.3	0.56	180%
HSH	0.4–0.9	3.0	0.52–1.2	83–190%
Isomalt	0.5	2.0	1.0	100%
Lactitol	0.4	2.0	0.8	125%
Maltitol	0.9	2.1	1.7	59%
Mannitol	0.5	1.6	1.2	83%
Sorbitol	0.6	2.6	0.92	108%
Xylitol	1.0	2.4	1.6	62%
Compare with: Sucrose	1.0	4.0	1.0	100%

== Research ==
=== Body weight ===
Reviews and dietetic professionals have concluded that moderate use of non-nutritive sweeteners as a safe replacement for sugars may help limit energy intake and assist with managing blood glucose and weight. Other reviews found that the association between body weight and non-nutritive sweetener usage is inconclusive. Observational studies tend to show a relation with increased body weight, while randomized controlled trials instead show a little causal weight loss. Other reviews concluded that use of non-nutritive sweeteners instead of sugar reduces body weight.

=== Obesity ===
There is little evidence that artificial sweeteners directly affect the onset and mechanisms of obesity

=== Cancer ===
Multiple reviews have found no link between artificial sweeteners and the risk of cancer. FDA scientists have reviewed scientific data regarding the safety of aspartame and different sweeteners in food, concluding that they are safe for the general population under common intake conditions.

=== Mortality ===
High consumption of artificially sweetened beverages was associated with a 12% higher risk of all-cause mortality and a 23% higher risk of cardiovascular disease (CVD) mortality in a 2021 meta-analysis. A 2020 meta-analysis found a similar result, with the highest-consuming group having a 13% higher risk of all-cause mortality and a 25% higher risk of CVD mortality. However, both studies also found similar or greater increases in all-cause mortality when consuming the same amount of sugar-sweetened beverages.

== Non-nutritive sweeteners vs sugar ==
The World Health Organization does not recommend using non-nutritive sweeteners to control body weight, based on a 2022 review that could only find small reductions in body fat and no effect on cardiometabolic risk. It recommends fruit or non-sweetened foods instead.

== See also ==
- VirtualTaste – database (2010)
