= TAS1R2 =

Protein-coding gene in humans

Identifiers
- Aliases: TAS1R2, GPR71, T1R2, TR2, taste 1 receptor member 2
- External IDs: OMIM: 606226; MGI: 1933546; GeneCards: TAS1R2

Gene location (Human)
Chr.	Chromosome 1 (human)
Band	1p36.13	Start	18,839,599 bp
Band	1p36.13	End	18,859,682 bp

Gene location (Mouse)
Chr.	Chromosome 4 (mouse)
Band	4 D3|4 70.82 cM	Start	139,380,849 bp
Band	4 D3|4 70.82 cM	End	139,397,591 bp
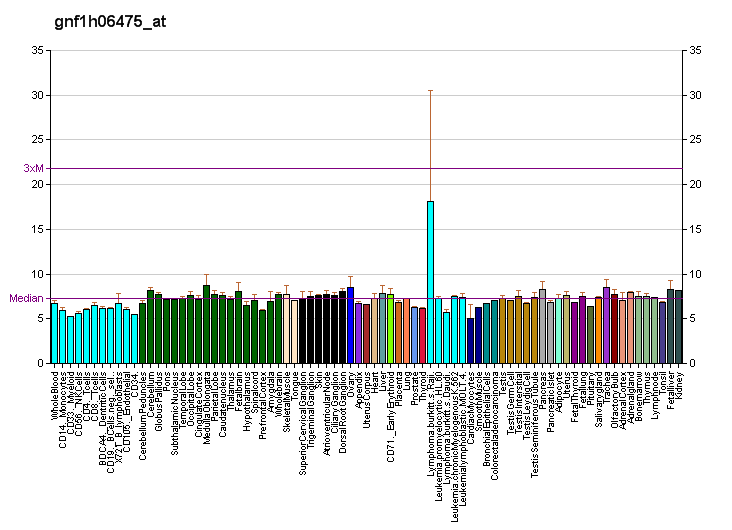
RNA expression pattern
Bgee	Human / Mouse (ortholog); Top expressed in: skin of leg; skin of abdomen; olfactory zone of nasal mucosa / n/a; More reference expression data
BioGPS	More reference expression data
Gene ontology
Molecular function	G protein-coupled receptor activity; signal transducer activity; taste receptor activity; protein heterodimerization activity; sweet taste receptor activity; signaling receptor activity
Cellular component	integral component of membrane; receptor complex; plasma membrane; sweet taste receptor complex; membrane; integral component of plasma membrane
Biological process	positive regulation of cytokinesis; sensory perception of taste; sensory perception of sweet taste; detection of chemical stimulus involved in sensory perception of sweet taste; signal transduction; response to stimulus; G protein-coupled receptor signaling pathway
Sources:Amigo / QuickGO
Orthologs
Databases	NCBI: entry; OMA: entry
Species	Human	Mouse
Entrez	80834	83770
Ensembl	ENSG00000179002	ENSMUSG00000028738
UniProt	Q8TE23	Q925I4
RefSeq (mRNA)	NM_152232	NM_031873
RefSeq (protein)	NP_689418	NP_114079
Location (UCSC)	Chr 1: 18.84 – 18.86 Mb	Chr 4: 139.38 – 139.4 Mb
PubMed search
- Wikidata
View/Edit Human	View/Edit Mouse

T1R2 - Taste receptor type 1 member 2 is a protein that in humans is encoded by the TAS1R2 gene.

The sweet taste receptor is predominantly formed as a heterodimer of T1R2 and T1R3 by which different organisms sense this taste. The mammalian sweet taste receptor was first characterized by Charles Zuker lab in 2001.

Some animals do not have the T1R2 monomer, such is the case for songbirds; in their case, sweetness is perceived through the umami taste receptor (T1R1 and T1R3).

== Gene ==
In humans, the TAS1R2 gene is located on chromosome 1 at band p36.13 (coordinates 18,839,599–18,859,660 on the reverse strand, GRCh38), and encodes a class C G protein-coupled receptor involved in sweet taste perception. The gene spans six exons and produces a protein of 839 amino acids that forms a functional heterodimer with TAS1R3 to detect sweet compounds. Its regulatory region contains multiple promoters and transcription factor binding sites, supporting tissue-specific gene expression. Genetic variation in TAS1R2 has been linked to differences in sweet taste sensitivity, sugar intake, and metabolic traits.

== Tissue distribution ==
T1R2+3 expressing cells are found in circumvallate papillae and foliate papillae near the back of the tongue and palate taste receptor cells in the roof of the mouth. These cells are shown to synapse upon the chorda tympani and glossopharyngeal nerves to send their signals to the brain. T1R and T2R (bitter) channels are not expressed together in taste buds.

== Structure ==
The TAS1R2 protein is a member of the class C G protein-coupled receptor (GPCR) family and plays a critical role in sweet taste perception as part of the TAS1R2/TAS1R3 heterodimer. Structurally, TAS1R2 features a large extracellular N-terminal domain known as the venus flytrap domain (VFD), which is responsible for binding a wide range of sweet-tasting compounds, including natural sugars and high-potency sweeteners. This VFD is connected to a seven-transmembrane domain (TMD) by a cysteine-rich domain (CRD), forming the canonical architecture of class C GPCRs. The TMD itself consists of seven alpha-helical segments that span the cell membrane and are involved in signal transduction. The integrity of the structure is further stabilized by multiple disulfide bridges within the VFD, CRD, and between domains. The overall architecture allows for ligand-induced conformational changes that are transmitted from the VFD through the CRD to the TMD, ultimately leading to G protein activation and downstream signaling.

The atomic structure of human sweet taste receptor (T1R2+T1R3) was resolved at 2024 by the same group that discovered the receptor.

== Function ==
The TAS1R2 protein is a crucial component of the sweet taste receptor, functioning primarily as part of a heterodimer with TAS1R3. This receptor complex is responsible for detecting a wide variety of sweet compounds, including natural sugars, artificial sweeteners, and some amino acids, in taste bud cells of the tongue. Upon binding of sweet molecules to the extracellular Venus flytrap domain of TAS1R2, the receptor undergoes conformational changes that trigger intracellular signaling cascades via G protein activation, ultimately leading to the perception of sweetness. Beyond its role in taste, TAS1R2 is also expressed in other tissues, such as skeletal muscle and the intestine, where it acts as a nutrient sensor. In skeletal muscle, TAS1R2 detects ambient glucose levels and regulates metabolic pathways by modulating NAD homeostasis and mitochondrial function through an ERK1/2-PARP1 signaling axis, thereby influencing muscle fitness and energy metabolism. Additionally, TAS1R2 activity in the gut can affect glucose absorption and insulin release, linking sweet taste perception to broader metabolic regulation. Genetic variations in TAS1R2 have been shown to influence individual differences in sweet taste sensitivity, sugar intake, and metabolic responses to glucose.

The T1R2+3 receptor has been shown to respond to natural sugars sucrose, sorbitol and fructose, and to the artificial sweeteners saccharin, acesulfame potassium, dulcin, guanidinoacetic acid, cyclamate, sucralose, alitame, neotame and neohesperidin dihydrochalcone (NHDC). Research initially suggested that rat receptors did not respond to many other natural and artificial sugars, such as glucose and aspartame, leading to the conclusion that there must be more than one type of sweet taste receptor. Contradictory evidence, however, suggested that cells expressing the human T1R2+3 receptor showed sensitivity to both aspartame and glucose but cells expressing the rat T1R2+3 receptor were only slightly activated by glucose and showed no aspartame activation. These results are inconclusive about the existence of another sweet taste receptor, but show that the T1R2+3 receptors are responsible for a wide variety of different sweet tastes. Finally, T1R2+3 responses to non-sugar natural sweeteners such as steviol glycosides from the leaves of the Stevia plant and sweet proteins like thaumatin, monellin, and brazzein. Another surprising ligand of the T1R2+3 is D_{2}O, also known as heavy water which was shown to activate the human T1R2+3 receptor.

== Receptor activation ==
In contrast to other class C GPCRs, sweet taste receptor exhibits great asymmetry during activation. Both ligand and G protein alpha subunit bind the TAS1R2, but not TAS1R3 subunit. TAS1R3 provides structural auxiliary support. Ligand binding to the VFT of T1R2 induced the closure of T1R2-VFT, but further opening the T1R3-VFT.

The canonical activation mechanism of class C GPCRs follows a multiple-step process that requires communication between the venus flytrap domains (VFDs) that houses the orthosteric-binding site and the transmembrane domains (TMDs) via the cysteine-rich domains (CRDs). Although the main binding site for most sweet compounds was found to reside in the VFT domain of T1R2, the T1R2 protein is not functional without formation of the 2+3 heterodimer.

Natural sweeteners interact with the orthosteric binding pocket of T1R2. The closure of the T1R2 extracellular domain involves the rotation of both T1R2 and T1R3 VFDs. The signal is then transmitted to the TMDs via the CRDs. It has also been shown that sweet proteins modulate the receptor by interacting with the CRD. Some artificial sweeteners as well as the inhibitor of the sweet taste receptor – lactisole, were shown to interact with the allosteric binding sites of one of the sub-units in the TMD.

== Signal transduction ==
T1R2 and T1R1 receptors have been shown to bind to G proteins, most often the gustducin Gα subunit, although a gusducin knock-out has shown small residual activity. T1R2 and T1R1 have also been shown to activate Gαo and Gαi protein subunits. This suggests that T1R1 and T1R2 are G protein-coupled receptors that inhibit adenylyl cyclases to decrease cyclic guanosine monophosphate (cGMP) levels in taste receptors. Research done by creating knock-outs of common channels activated by sensory G-protein second messenger systems has also shown a connection between sweet taste perception and the phosphatidylinositol (PIP2) pathway. The nonselective cation Transient Receptor Potential channel TRPM5 has been shown to correlate with both umami and sweet taste. Also, the phospholipase PLCβ2 was shown to similarly correlate with umami and sweet taste. This suggests that activation of the G-protein pathway and subsequent activation of PLC β2 and the TRPM5 channel in these taste cells functions to activate the cell.

== See also ==
- Taste receptor
- TAS1R1
- TAS1R3
