= TAS1R3 =

Mammalian protein found in humans

Identifiers
- Aliases: TAS1R3, T1R3, taste 1 receptor member 3
- External IDs: OMIM: 605865; MGI: 1933547; GeneCards: TAS1R3

Gene location (Human)
Chr.	Chromosome 1 (human)
Band	1p36.33	Start	1,331,280 bp
Band	1p36.33	End	1,335,314 bp

Gene location (Mouse)
Chr.	Chromosome 4 (mouse)
Band	4 E2|4 87.65 cM	Start	155,943,725 bp
Band	4 E2|4 87.65 cM	End	155,947,819 bp
RNA expression pattern
Bgee	Human / Mouse (ortholog); Top expressed in: bone marrow cell; mucosa of transverse colon; spleen; tonsil; duodenum; lymph node; ganglionic eminence; muscle of thigh; sural nerve; gastrocnemius muscle / Top expressed in: ascending aorta; aortic valve; morula; granulocyte; tongue; tail of embryo; supraoptic nucleus; ganglionic eminence; esophagus; jejunum; More reference expression data
BioGPS	n/a
Gene ontology
Molecular function	G protein-coupled receptor activity; signal transducer activity; taste receptor activity; protein heterodimerization activity; sweet taste receptor activity; signaling receptor activity
Cellular component	integral component of membrane; plasma membrane; sweet taste receptor complex; membrane; integral component of plasma membrane
Biological process	sensory perception of taste; sensory perception of sweet taste; sensory perception of umami taste; detection of chemical stimulus involved in sensory perception of sweet taste; signal transduction; response to stimulus; G protein-coupled receptor signaling pathway
Sources:Amigo / QuickGO
Orthologs
Databases	NCBI: entry; OMA: entry
Species	Human	Mouse
Entrez	83756	83771
Ensembl	ENSG00000169962	ENSMUSG00000029072
UniProt	Q7RTX0	Q925D8
RefSeq (mRNA)	NM_152228	NM_031872
RefSeq (protein)	NP_689414	NP_114078
Location (UCSC)	Chr 1: 1.33 – 1.34 Mb	Chr 4: 155.94 – 155.95 Mb
PubMed search
- Wikidata
View/Edit Human	View/Edit Mouse

Taste receptor type 1 member 3 is a protein that in humans is encoded by the TAS1R3 gene. The TAS1R3 gene encodes the human homolog of mouse Sac taste receptor, a major determinant of differences between sweet-sensitive and -insensitive mouse strains in their responsiveness to sucrose, saccharin, and other sweeteners.

== Structure ==
The protein encoded by the TAS1R3 gene is a G protein-coupled receptor with seven trans-membrane domains and is a component of the heterodimeric amino acid taste receptor TAS1R1+3 and sweet taste receptor TAS1R2+3. This receptor is formed as a protein dimer with either TAS1R1 or TAS1R2. Experiments have also shown that a homo-dimer of TAS1R3 is also sensitive to natural sugar substances. This has been hypothesized as the mechanism by which sugar substitutes do not have the same taste qualities as natural sugars.

== Ligands ==
The G protein-coupled receptors for sweet and umami taste are formed by dimers of the TAS1R proteins. The TAS1R1+3 taste receptor is sensitive to the glutamate in monosodium glutamate (MSG) as well as the synergistic taste-enhancer molecules inosine monophosphate (IMP) and guanosine monophosphate (GMP). These taste-enhancer molecules are unable to activate the receptor alone, but are rather used to enhance receptor responses many to L-amino acids. The TAS1R2+3 receptor has been shown to respond to natural sugars sucrose and fructose, and artificial sweeteners saccharin, acesulfame potassium, dulcin, guanidinoacetic acid.

== Signal transduction ==
TAS1R2 and TAS1R1 receptors have been shown to bind to G proteins, most often the gustducin Gα subunit, although a gustducin knock-out has shown small residual activity. TAS1R2 and TAS1R1 have also been shown to activate Gαo and Gαi protein subunits. This suggests that TAS1R1 and TAS1R2 are G protein-coupled receptors that inhibit adenylyl cyclases to decrease cyclic guanosine monophosphate (cGMP) levels in taste receptors. The TAS1R3 protein, however, has been shown in vitro to couple with Gα subunits at a much lower rate than the other TAS1R proteins. While the protein structures of the TAS1R proteins are similar, this experiment shows that the G protein-coupling properties of TAS1R3 may be less important in the transduction of taste signals than the TAS1R1 and TAS1R2 proteins.

== Location and innervation ==
TAS1R1+3 expressing cells are found in fungiform papillae at the tip and edges of the tongue and palate taste receptor cells in the roof of the mouth. These cells are shown to synapse upon the chorda tympani nerves to send their signals to the brain. TAS1R2+3 expressing cells are found in circumvallate papillae and foliate papillae near the back of the tongue and palate taste receptor cells in the roof of the mouth. These cells are shown to synapse upon the glossopharyngeal nerves to send their signals to the brain. TAS1R and TAS2R (bitter) channels are not expressed together in any taste buds.
