= S9632 =

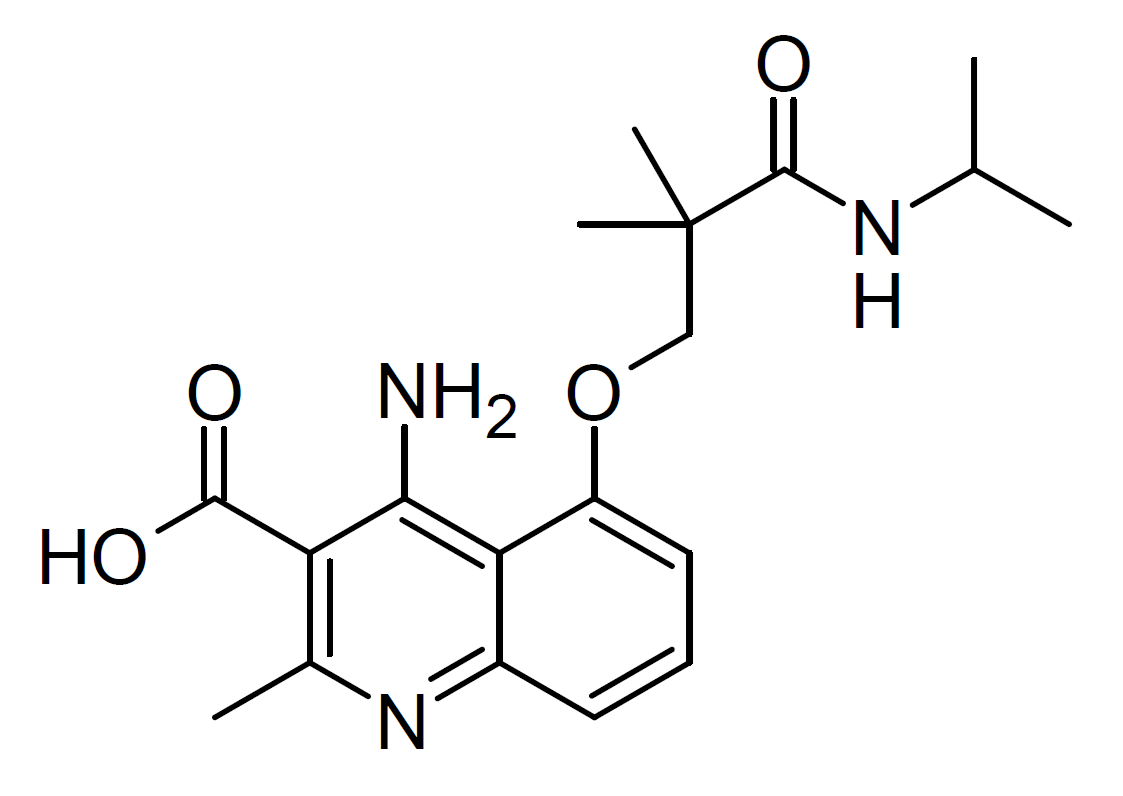

Identifiers
- IUPAC name: 4-amino-5-[2,2-dimethyl-3-oxo-3-(propan-2-ylamino)propoxy]-2-methylquinoline-3-carboxylic acid
- CAS Number: 1359963-68-0
- PubChem CID: 66746559
- ChemSpider: 28475396
- UNII: QCE6H7E9VS
- ChEMBL: ChEMBL4561660

Chemical and physical data
- Formula: C_{19}H_{25}N_{3}O_{4}
- Molar mass: 359.426 g·mol^{−1}
- 3D model (JSmol): Interactive image
- SMILES: CC1=C(C(=C2C(=N1)C=CC=C2OCC(C)(C)C(=O)NC(C)C)N)C(=O)O
- InChI: InChI=1S/C19H25N3O4/c1-10(2)21-18(25)19(4,5)9-26-13-8-6-7-12-15(13)16(20)14(17(23)24)11(3)22-12/h6-8,10H,9H2,1-5H3,(H2,20,22)(H,21,25)(H,23,24); Key:RHXLOOCFQPJWBW-UHFFFAOYSA-N

S9632 (FEMA 4774) is a food additive which acts as a positive allosteric modulator of the TAS1R2/TAS1R3 heterodimer that is the primary sweet taste receptor in humans. It is described as a flavour modifier, having little taste of its own but causing sweet flavours to taste sweeter and enhancing certain aspects of the flavour profile. It was approved for use in food in 2012 and is used in various countries including the United States, Japan, South Korea, and Mexico.

== See also ==
- S6821
- Miraculin
