= Advantame =

Names
- IUPAC name Methyl N-[3-(3-Hydroxy-4-methoxyphenyl)propyl]aspartylphenylalaninate
- Systematic IUPAC name (3S)-3-{[3-(3-Hydroxy-4-methoxyphenyl)propyl]amino}-4-{[(2S)-1-methoxy-1-oxo-3-phenylpropan-2-yl]amino}-4-oxobutanoic acid
- Other names N-[N-[3-(3-Hydroxy-4-methoxyphenyl)propyl]-α-L-aspartyl]-L-phenylalanine 1-methyl ester

Identifiers
CAS Number	714229-20-6 (monohydrate); 245650-17-3 (anhydrous)
3D model (JSmol)	Interactive image
ChemSpider	8564873
E number	E969 (glazing agents, ...)
PubChem CID	10389431
UNII	3ZA6810AWX (monohydrate); M501L2WP44 (anhydrous)
CompTox Dashboard (EPA)	DTXSID60179302
- InChI: InChI=1S/C24H30N2O7/c1-32-21-11-10-17(14-20(21)27)9-6-12-25-18(15-22(28)29)23(30)26-19(24(31)33-2)13-16-7-4-3-5-8-16/h3-5,7-8,10-11,14,18-19,25,27H,6,9,12-13,15H2,1-2H3,(H,26,30)(H,28,29)/t18-,19-/m0/s1 Key: YTKBWWKAVMSYHE-OALUTQOASA-N; InChI=1/C24H30N2O7/c1-32-21-11-10-17(14-20(21)27)9-6-12-25-18(15-22(28)29)23(30)26-19(24(31)33-2)13-16-7-4-3-5-8-16/h3-5,7-8,10-11,14,18-19,25,27H,6,9,12-13,15H2,1-2H3,(H,26,30)(H,28,29)/t18-,19-/m0/s1 Key: YTKBWWKAVMSYHE-OALUTQOABU
- SMILES: COC1=C(C=C(C=C1)CCCN[C@@H](CC(=O)O)C(=O)N[C@@H](CC2=CC=CC=C2)C(=O)OC)O

Properties
Chemical formula	C_{24}H_{30}N_{2}O_{7}
Molar mass	458.511 g·mol^{−1}
Appearance	white to yellow powder
Melting point	101.5 °C (214.7 °F; 374.6 K)
Solubility in water	0.99 g/L at 25 °C

Hazards
Safety data sheet (SDS)	External MSDS
- Except where otherwise noted, data are given for materials in their standard state (at 25 °C [77 °F], 100 kPa). Infobox references

Advantame is a non-caloric artificial sweetener and aspartame analog by Ajinomoto. By mass, it is about 20,000 times sweeter than sucrose and about 110 times sweeter than aspartame. It has no notable off-flavors when compared to sucrose and tastes sweet a bit longer than aspartame and is chemically more stable. It can be blended with many other natural and artificial sweeteners.

Advantame can be used as a table top sweetener and in certain bubblegums, flavored drinks, milk products, jams and confectionery among other things.

In 2013, it was approved for use in foods within EU with the E number E969. In 2014, FDA approved advantame as a non-nutritive sweetener and flavor enhancer within United States in foods generally, except meat and poultry.

== Safety ==
The FDA acceptable daily intake of advantame for humans is 32.8 mg per kg of bodyweight (mg/kg bw), while according to EFSA it is 5 mg per kg of bodyweight (mg/kg bw). Estimated possible daily intakes from foods are well below these levels. NOAEL for humans is 500 mg/kg bw in EU. Ingested advantame can form phenylalanine, but normal use of advantame is not significant to those with phenylketonuria. It also has no adverse effects in type 2 diabetics. It is not considered to be carcinogenic or mutagenic.

The Center for Science in the Public Interest ranks advantame as safe and as generally recognized as safe.

== Sweetness ==
Relative sweetness of advantame varies. It depends on the concentration and food/matrix in which it is used. In water solutions of advantame, that are equivalently sweet to water solutions of 3–14 percentage sucrose by weight (wt%), advantame is 7000–47700 times sweeter. Relative sweetness of advantame increases logarithmically as the sucrose concentration of a comparably sweet sucrose solution increases, but eventually reaches a plateau. By extrapolation, sweetness of an advantame water solution is estimated to reach a maximum at a concentration that is equivalent to a 15.8 wt% sucrose water solution.

== Chemistry ==
Advantame is formally a secondary amine of aspartame and 3-(3-hydroxy-4-methoxyphenyl)propanal (HMPA). Structurally advantame resembles a combination of aspartame and phyllodulcin.

Advantame has 2 stereocenters and 4 stereoisomers.

Advantame can be made from aspartame and vanillin. Vanillin is transformed to HMPA in 4 steps. 3-hydroxy-4-methoxycinnamaldehyde (HMCA) is formed in the third step. HMCA is hydrogenated to HMPA in the final step. HMPA is selectively hydrogenated with palladium on aluminium oxide and platinum on carbon in one step to advantame in methanol with aspartame. Product is crystallized. Crude crystals are washed, recrystallized, washed and dried.

At 15 °C the solubility of advantame is 0.76 g/L in water, 7.98 g/L in ethanol and 1.65 g/L in ethyl acetate. At 25 °C the solubilities are 0.99 g/L, 13.58 g/L and 2.79 g/L, respectively. At 40 °C the solubilities are 2.10 g/L, 38.27 g/L and 7.96 g/L, respectively. At 50 °C the solubilities are 3.10 g/L, 98.68 g/L and 16.00 g/L, respectively.

Advantame as a dry powder degrades very slowly at 25 °C and 60% relative humidity and can last for years under such conditions. It can last for more than a year in aqueous solutions at pH 3.2. This corresponds to the typical pH of soft drinks. It degrades faster at higher temperatures and humidity, but is generally more stable than aspartame. Unlike aspartame, advantame doesn't form a diketopiperazine via intra-molecular cyclization due to steric hindrance by the vanillyl group.

== Metabolism ==
In humans, 89% of the ingested advantame is excreted in feces and 6.2% in urine. Some is excreted unchanged, but most as metabolites. Advantame is poorly absorbed, rapidly metabolized and only small amounts of it and its metabolites can be detected in blood shortly after ingestion.

52% of the ingested dose is excreted in feces as de-esterified advantame and 30% as N-(3-(3-hydroxy-4-methoxyphenyl))propyl-L-aspartic acid and as an equivalent molar amount of phenylalanine. 1% of the ingested dose is excreted in urine as the aforementioned aspartic acid analog, 1.9% as 5-(3-aminopropyl)-2-methoxyphenyl and 2.3% as de-esterified advantame. Methanol forms in de-esterification, but this is considered insignificant at advantame concentrations intended to be used in foods, and in comparison to methanol naturally formed in body and to methanol naturally found in foods.

== History ==
Ajinomoto developed advantame and announced its structure publicly in print in 2008. At first advantame was identified by the laboratory code ANS9801. Aspartame, neotame and aspartame N-substituted with asparagine via amide bond (covered in US patent 5,286,509) were selected as the lead compounds for research that lead to advantame.
