= Alitame =

Names
- IUPAC name (3S)-3-amino-4-[ [(1R)-1-methyl-2-oxo-2-[(2,2,4,4-tetramethyl-3-thietanyl)amino]ethyl]amino]-4-oxobutanoic acid
- Other names L-alpha-Aspartyl-N-(2,2,4,4-tetramethyl-3-thietanyl)-D-alaninamide

Identifiers
CAS Number	80863-62-3 (anhydrous); 99016-42-9 (hydrate)
3D model (JSmol)	Interactive image; Interactive image
ChEMBL	ChEMBL2104004
ChemSpider	58297
E number	E956 (glazing agents, ...)
PubChem CID	64763
UNII	PCE8DAE750 (anhydrous); 6KI9M51JOG (hydrate)
CompTox Dashboard (EPA)	DTXSID3043780
- InChI: InChI=1S/C14H25N3O4S/c1-7(16-11(21)8(15)6-9(18)19)10(20)17-12-13(2,3)22-14(12,4)5/h7-8,12H,6,15H2,1-5H3,(H,16,21)(H,17,20)(H,18,19)/t7-,8+/m1/s1 Key: IVBOUFAWPCPFTQ-SFYZADRCSA-N; InChI=1/C14H25N3O4S/c1-7(16-11(21)8(15)6-9(18)19)10(20)17-12-13(2,3)22-14(12,4)5/h7-8,12H,6,15H2,1-5H3,(H,16,21)(H,17,20)(H,18,19)/t7-,8+/m1/s1 Key: IVBOUFAWPCPFTQ-SFYZADRCBL
- SMILES: CC(C(=O)NC1C(SC1(C)C)(C)C)NC(=O)C(CC(=O)O)N; O=C(NC1C(SC1(C)C)(C)C)[C@H](NC(=O)[C@@H](N)CC(=O)O)C

Properties
Chemical formula	C_{14}H_{25}N_{3}O_{4}S
Molar mass	331.431
- Except where otherwise noted, data are given for materials in their standard state (at 25 °C [77 °F], 100 kPa). verify (what is ?) Infobox references

Alitame is an aspartic acid-containing dipeptide sweetener. It was developed by Pfizer in the early 1980s and currently marketed in some countries under the brand name Aclame. Most dipeptides are not sweet, but the unexpected discovery of aspartame in 1965 led to a search for similar compounds that shared its sweetness.

Alitame is about 2000 times sweeter than sucrose (table sugar), about 10 times sweeter than aspartame, and has no aftertaste. Its half-life under hot or acidic conditions is about twice as long as aspartame's, although some other artificial sweeteners, including saccharin and acesulfame potassium, are more stable yet. Unlike aspartame, alitame does not contain phenylalanine, and can therefore be used by people with phenylketonuria.

Alitame has approved for use in Mexico, Australia, New Zealand and China. Danisco has withdrawn its petition for using alitame as a sweetening agent or flavoring in food in US.

Sweeny also addresses a compound with a sweetness of 1200 x sucrose in his review, in U.S. patent 4,411,925 based on an NH-CH(cyclopropyl)tert-butyl (Ex 6). Ex 5, with NH-CH(cyclopropyl)2 is also 1200 x sucrose. These are good basis for 2nd class picks. Ex 16 is for Alitame proper. Although, in Ex 17, oxidation to the sulfonyl can reduce activity to 1000.
