= Sugar alcohol =

Organic compounds

Erythritol is a sugar alcohol. It is 60–70% as sweet as sugar and almost noncaloric.

Sugar alcohols (also called polyhydric alcohols, polyalcohols, alditols or glycitols) are organic compounds, typically derived from sugars, containing one hydroxyl group (−OH) attached to each carbon atom. They are white, water-soluble solids that can occur naturally or be produced industrially by hydrogenating sugars. Since they contain multiple (−OH) groups, they are classified as polyols.

Sugar alcohols are used widely in the food industry as thickeners and sweeteners. In commercial foodstuffs, sugar alcohols are commonly used in place of table sugar (sucrose), often in combination with high-intensity artificial sweeteners, in order to offset their low sweetness. Xylitol and sorbitol are popular sugar alcohols in commercial foods.

Sugar alcohols are synthesised by most microorganisms and plants, with roles in maintaining cellular water balance and responding to stresses, such as water deficiency or low temperature.

Sugar alcohols do not cause drunkenness.

== Structure ==
Simple sugar alcohols have the general formula HOCH_{2}(CHOH)_{n}CH_{2}OH. In contrast, sugars have two fewer hydrogen atoms, for example, HOCH_{2}(CHOH)_{n}CHO or HOCH_{2}(CHOH)_{n−1}C(O)CH_{2}OH. Like their parent sugars, sugar alcohols exist in diverse chain length. Most have five- or six-carbon chains, because they are derived respectively from pentoses (five-carbon sugars) and hexoses (six-carbon sugars), which are the more common sugars. They have one −OH group attached to each carbon. They are further differentiated by the relative orientation (stereochemistry) of these −OH groups. Unlike sugars, which tend to exist as rings, sugar alcohols do not, although they can be dehydrated to give cyclic ethers (e.g. sorbitan can be dehydrated to isosorbide).

Lactitol is one of several sugar alcohols produced from disaccharides

Some disaccharides can be hydrogenated to give useful disaccharide alcohols with retention of the acetal linkage. Commercial products include lactitol, isomalt, and maltitol.

== Production ==
Sugar alcohols can be, and often are, produced from renewable resources. Particular feedstocks are starch, cellulose and hemicellulose; the main conversion technologies use H_{2} as the reagent: hydrogenolysis, i.e. the cleavage of C−O single bonds, converting polymers to smaller molecules, and hydrogenation of C=O double bonds, converting sugars to sugar alcohols.

=== Sorbitol and mannitol ===
Mannitol is no longer obtained from natural sources; currently, sorbitol and mannitol are obtained by hydrogenation of sugars, using Raney nickel catalysts. The conversion of glucose and mannose to sorbitol and mannitol is given as

HOCH_{2}CH(OH)CH(OH)CH(OH)CH(OH)CHO + H_{2} → HOCH_{2}CH(OH)CH(OH)CH(OH)CH(OH)CHHOH

=== Erythritol ===
Erythritol is obtained by the fermentation of glucose and sucrose.

== Common sugar alcohols ==
- Ethylene glycol (2-carbon)
- Glycerol (3-carbon)
- Erythritol (4-carbon)
- Threitol (4-carbon)
- Arabitol (5-carbon)
- Xylitol (5-carbon)
- Ribitol (5-carbon)
- Mannitol (6-carbon)
- Sorbitol (6-carbon)
- Galactitol (6-carbon)
- Fucitol (6-carbon)
- Iditol (6-carbon)
- Inositol (6-carbon; a cyclic sugar alcohol)
- Volemitol (7-carbon)
- Isomalt (12-carbon)
- Maltitol (12-carbon)
- Lactitol (12-carbon)
- Maltotriitol (18-carbon)
- Maltotetraitol (24-carbon)
- Polyglycitol

Both disaccharides and monosaccharides can form sugar alcohols; however, sugar alcohols derived from disaccharides (e.g. maltitol and lactitol) are not entirely hydrogenated because only one aldehyde group is available for reduction.

== Sugar alcohols as food additives ==
This table presents the relative sweetness and food energy of the most widely used sugar alcohols. Despite the variance in food energy content of sugar alcohols, the European Union's labeling requirements assign a blanket value of 2.4 kcal/g to all sugar alcohols.

Properties of sugar alcohols
| Name | Relative sweetness (%)^{a} | Food energy (kcal/g)^{b} | Relative food energy (%)^{b} | Relative food energy for reference sweetness(%)^{a,b} | Glycemic index^{c} | Maximum non-laxative dose (g/kg body weight) | Dental acidity^{d} |
|---|---|---|---|---|---|---|---|
| Arabitol | 70 | 0.2 | 5.0 | 7.1 | ? | ? | ? |
| Erythritol | 60–80 | 0.21 | 5.3 | 6.6–8.8 | 0 | 0.66–1.0+ | None |
| Glycerol | 60 | 4.3 | 108 | 179.2 | 3 | ? | ? |
| HSHs | 40–90 | 3.0 | 75 | 83.3–187.5 | 35 | ? | ? |
| Isomalt | 45–65 | 2.0 | 50 | 76.9–111.1 | 2–9 | 0.3 | ? |
| Lactitol | 30–40 | 2.0 | 50 | 125.0–166.7 | 5–6 | 0.34 | Minor |
| Maltitol | 90 | 2.1 | 53 | 58.3 | 35–52 | 0.3 | Minor |
| Mannitol | 40–70 | 1.6 | 40 | 57.1–100.0 | 0 | 0.3 | Minor |
| Sorbitol | 40–70 | 2.6 | 65 | 92.9–162.5 | 9 | 0.17–0.24 | Minor |
| Xylitol | 100 | 2.4 | 60 | 60.0 | 12–13 | 0.3–0.42 | None |
Footnotes: ^{a} = Sucrose is 100%. ^{b} = Carbohydrates, including sugars like glucose, sucrose, and fructose, are ~4.0 kcal/g and 100%. ^{c} = Glucose is 100 and sucrose is 60–68. ^{d} = Sugars, like glucose, sucrose, and fructose, are high. References:

=== Characteristics ===
As a group, sugar alcohols are not as sweet as sucrose, and they have slightly less food energy than sucrose. Their flavor is similar to sucrose, and they can be used to mask the unpleasant aftertastes of some high-intensity sweeteners.

Sugar alcohols are not metabolized by oral bacteria, and so they do not contribute to tooth decay. They do not brown or caramelize when heated.

In addition to their sweetness, some sugar alcohols can produce a noticeable cooling sensation in the mouth when highly concentrated, for instance in sugar-free hard candy or chewing gum. This happens, for example, with the crystalline phase of sorbitol, erythritol, xylitol, mannitol, lactitol and maltitol. The cooling sensation is due to the dissolution of the sugar alcohol being an endothermic (heat-absorbing) reaction, one with a strong heat of solution.

=== Absorption from the small intestine ===
Sugar alcohols are usually incompletely absorbed into the blood stream from the small intestine which generally results in a smaller change in blood glucose than "regular" sugar (sucrose). This property makes them popular sweeteners among diabetics and people on low-carbohydrate diets. As an exception, erythritol is actually absorbed in the small intestine and excreted unchanged through urine, so it contributes no calories even though it is rather sweet.

== Health effects ==
Sugar alcohols do not contribute to tooth decay; in fact, xylitol deters tooth decay.

Sugar alcohols are absorbed at 50% of the rate of sugars, resulting in less of an effect on blood sugar levels as measured by comparing their effect to sucrose using the glycemic index.

Like many other incompletely digestible substances, overconsumption of sugar alcohols can lead to bloating, diarrhea, and flatulence, because they are not fully absorbed in the small intestine. Some individuals experience such symptoms even in a single-serving quantity. With continued use, most people develop a degree of tolerance to sugar alcohols and no longer experience these symptoms.

== See also ==
- Sucralose, an artificial sweetener and sugar substitute
