= Sodium ferulate =

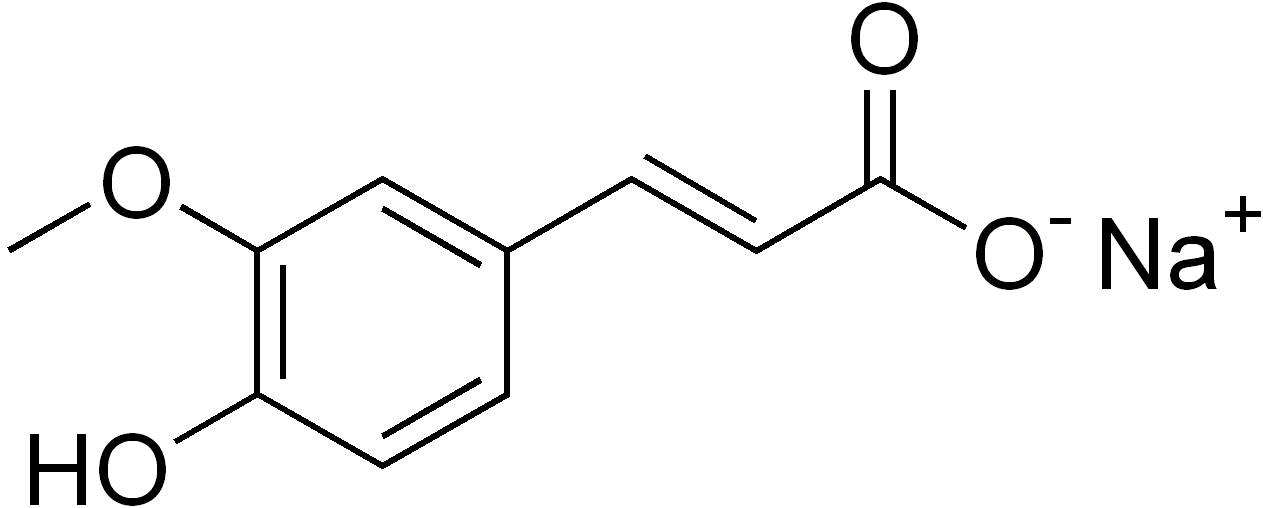

Names
- Preferred IUPAC name Sodium (2E)-3-(4-hydroxy-3-methoxyphenyl)prop-2-enoate

Identifiers
CAS Number	24276-84-4
3D model (JSmol)	Interactive image
ChEBI	CHEBI:114954
ChemSpider	4479130
PubChem CID	5321361
UNII	OIS7F1IRQK
CompTox Dashboard (EPA)	DTXSID601034731 DTXSID80894080, DTXSID601034731
- InChI: InChI=1S/C10H10O4.Na/c1-14-9-6-7(2-4-8(9)11)3-5-10(12)13;/h2-6,11H,1H3,(H,12,13);/q;+1/p-1/b5-3+; Key: NCTHNHPAQAVBEB-WGCWOXMQSA-M; InChI=1/C10H10O4.Na/c1-14-9-6-7(2-4-8(9)11)3-5-10(12)13;/h2-6,11H,1H3,(H,12,13);/q;+1/p-1/b5-3+; Key: NCTHNHPAQAVBEB-OLHRVHTCBT
- SMILES: [Na+].[O-]C(=O)\C=C\c1cc(OC)c(O)cc1

Properties
Chemical formula	C_{10}H_{9}NaO_{4}
Molar mass	216.17 g/mol
- Except where otherwise noted, data are given for materials in their standard state (at 25 °C [77 °F], 100 kPa). verify (what is ?) Infobox references

Sodium ferulate, the sodium salt of ferulic acid, is a compound used in traditional Chinese medicine thought to be useful for treatment of cardiovascular and cerebrovascular diseases and to prevent thrombosis, although there is no high-quality clinical evidence for such effects. It is found in the root of Angelica sinensis. Ferulic acid can also be extracted from the root of the Chinese herb Ligusticum chuanxiong.

Kraft Foods patented the use of sodium ferulate to mask the aftertaste of the artificial sweetener acesulfame potassium.
