= Minimal nutritional value =

Designation for food in US law

In United States law, a food of minimal nutritional value is one that USDA has determined contains little to no nutritional value; these foods may not be sold in competition with the school lunch and breakfast programs. For example, sugar candy, soda and other sugary drinks without fruit juices, and chewing gum are considered to be foods of minimal nutritional value. Candy containing nuts or chocolate is considered to have some nutritional value.

== Examples ==
The USDA defines these categories of food as having minimal nutritional value:

- Soda water, including diet soda
- Italian ice, unless made with fruit or fruit juices
- Chewing gum
- Some kinds of candy, including hard candy, jelly beans, gummy candies, marshmallows, fondant candies such as butter mints, licorice, cotton candy, and candy-coated popcorn.

== See also ==
- National School Lunch Act
