= Aspartame-acesulfame salt =

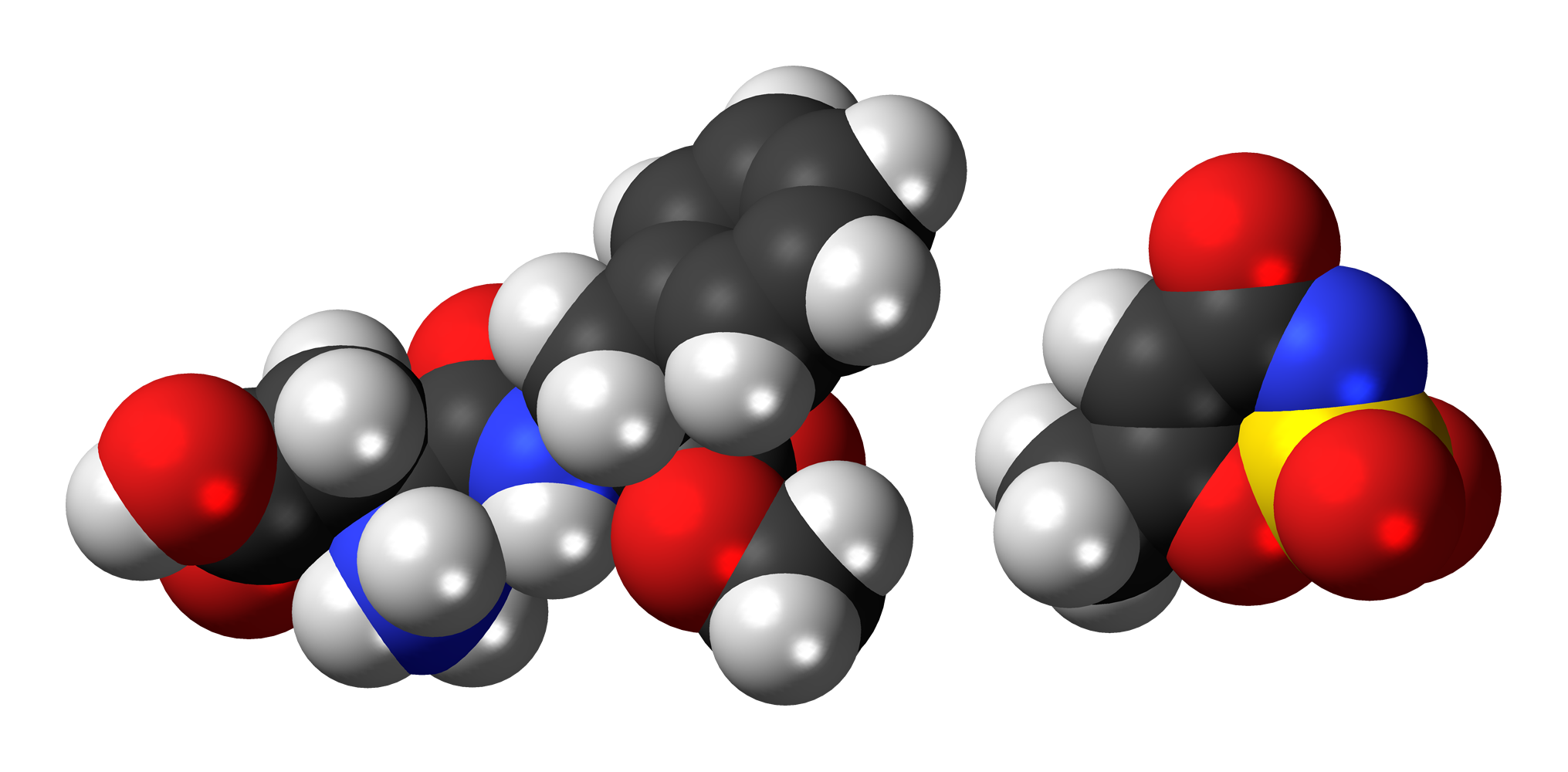

Names
- IUPAC name [2-carboxyl-1-(N-(1-methoxycarbonyl-2-phenyl)ethylcarbamoyl)]ethanaminium 6-methyl-4-oxo-1,2,3-oxathiazin-3-ide-2,2-dioxide
- Other names Salt of Aspartame-acesulfame Twinsweet

Identifiers
CAS Number	106372-55-8
3D model (JSmol)	Interactive image
ChemSpider	9147744
E number	E962 (glazing agents, ...)
PubChem CID	10972537
UNII	IFE6C6BS24
CompTox Dashboard (EPA)	DTXSID30909991
- InChI: InChI=1S/C14H18N2O5.C4H5NO4S/c1-21-14(20)11(7-9-5-3-2-4-6-9)16-13(19)10(15)8-12(17)18;1-3-2-4(6)5-10(7,8)9-3/h2-6,10-11H,7-8,15H2,1H3,(H,16,19)(H,17,18);2H,1H3,(H,5,6)/t10-,11-;/m0./s1 Key: KVHQNWGLVVERFR-ACMTZBLWSA-N; InChI=1/C14H18N2O5.C4H5NO4S/c1-21-14(20)11(7-9-5-3-2-4-6-9)16-13(19)10(15)8-12(17)18;1-3-2-4(6)5-10(7,8)9-3/h2-6,10-11H,7-8,15H2,1H3,(H,16,19)(H,17,18);2H,1H3,(H,5,6)/t10-,11-;/m0./s1 Key: KVHQNWGLVVERFR-ACMTZBLWBH
- SMILES: O=S1(=O)O/C(=C\C(=O)[NH2+]1)C.[O-]C(=O)C[C@H](N)C(=O)N[C@H](C(=O)OC)Cc1ccccc1

Properties
Chemical formula	C_{18}H_{23}N_{3}O_{9}S
Molar mass	457.45 g·mol^{−1}
Appearance	white crystalline powder
- Except where otherwise noted, data are given for materials in their standard state (at 25 °C [77 °F], 100 kPa). verify (what is ?) Infobox references

Aspartame-acesulfame salt is an artificial sweetener marketed under the name Twinsweet. It is produced by soaking a 2:1 mixture of aspartame and acesulfame potassium in an acidic solution and allowing it to crystallize; moisture and potassium are removed during this process. It is approximately 350 times as sweet as sucrose. It has been given the E number E962.

== History ==
Aspartame-acesulfame salt was invented in 1995 by sweetener expert Dr John Fry while working for The Holland Sweetener Company (HSC), a subsidiary of DSM. HSC marketed it with the name Twinsweet. It was approved for use as an artificial sweetener in the European Parliament and Council Directive 94/35 EC as amended by Directive 2003/115/EC in 2003. In North America, it falls under the same regulations as aspartame and acesulfame-K. It is also approved for use in China, Russia, Hong Kong, Australia, and New Zealand.

In December 2006, HSC ceased all of its aspartame operations, citing a glut in the market driving prices below profitable values. The rights to aspartame-acesulfame are now owned by The NutraSweet Company Inc., who has continued to market the sweetener successfully in the United States and European Union.
