= 3,3-Dimethylbutyraldehyde =

Organic compound

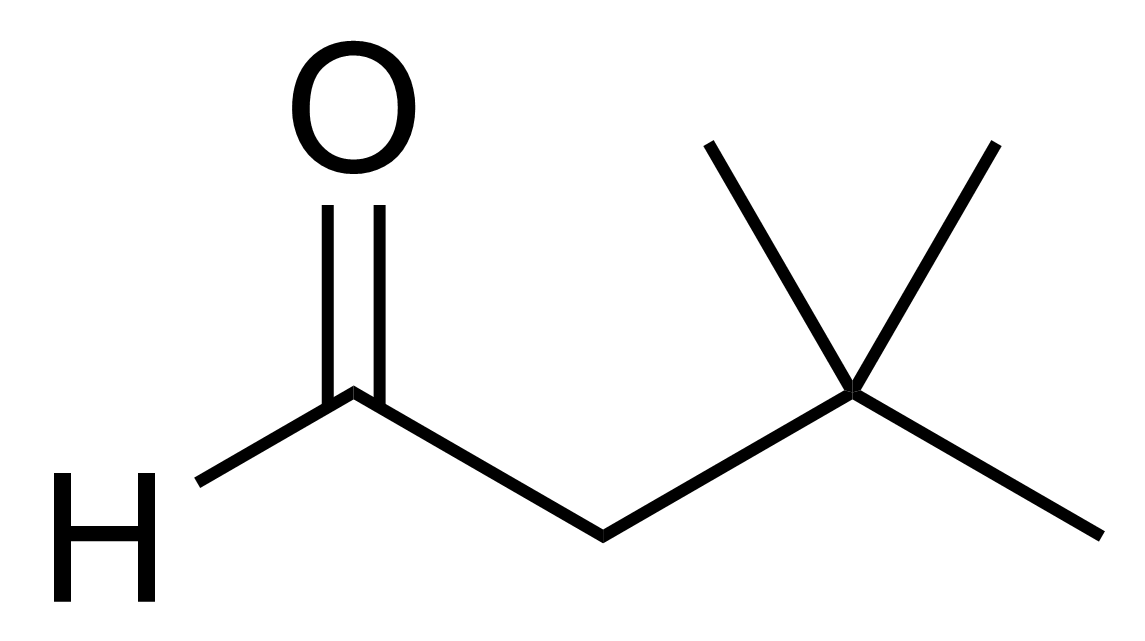

Names
- Preferred IUPAC name 3,3-Dimethylbutanal
- Other names: Neohexanal; 3,3-Dimethylbutyraldehyde; 3-Methylisovaleraldehyde; tert-Butylacetaldehyde

Identifiers
CAS Number	2987-16-8
3D model (JSmol)	Interactive image
ChemSpider	68812
ECHA InfoCard	100.019.141
EC Number	221-054-3
PubChem CID	76335
UNII	CAM6HD7JKI
CompTox Dashboard (EPA)	DTXSID60183984
- InChI: InChI=1S/C6H12O/c1-6(2,3)4-5-7/h5H,4H2,1-3H3 Key: LTNUSYNQZJZUSY-UHFFFAOYSA-N
- SMILES: CC(C)(C)CC=O

Properties
Chemical formula	C_{6}H_{12}O
Molar mass	100.161 g·mol^{−1}
Appearance	clear fluid
Odor	unpleasant
Density	0.798 g/cm^{3} (at 25 °C (77 °F))
Melting point	−24 °C (−11 °F; 249 K)
Boiling point	104 to 106 °C (219 to 223 °F; 377 to 379 K)
Solubility in water	7.6 g/L

Hazards
- GHS labelling
Pictograms	(GHS02: Flammable) (GHS07: Exclamation mark)
Hazard statements	H225, H315, H319, H335
Precautionary statements	P210, P302+P352, P305+P351+P338
- Except where otherwise noted, data are given for materials in their standard state (at 25 °C [77 °F], 100 kPa). Infobox references

3,3-Dimethylbutyraldehyde is a branched saturated aliphatic aldehyde with an unpleasant odor that is used in the synthesis of perfumes and neotame.

== Synthesis ==
It can be synthesized from 3,3-dimethyl-1-butanol via a copper catalyzed dehydrogenation.

== Other sources ==
K. Satyavathi, P.B. Raju, K.V. Bupesh, T.N.R. Kiran (2010), "Mini Review. Neotame: High Intensity Low Caloric Sweetener", Asian J. Chem. 7 (22).
