= Monatin =

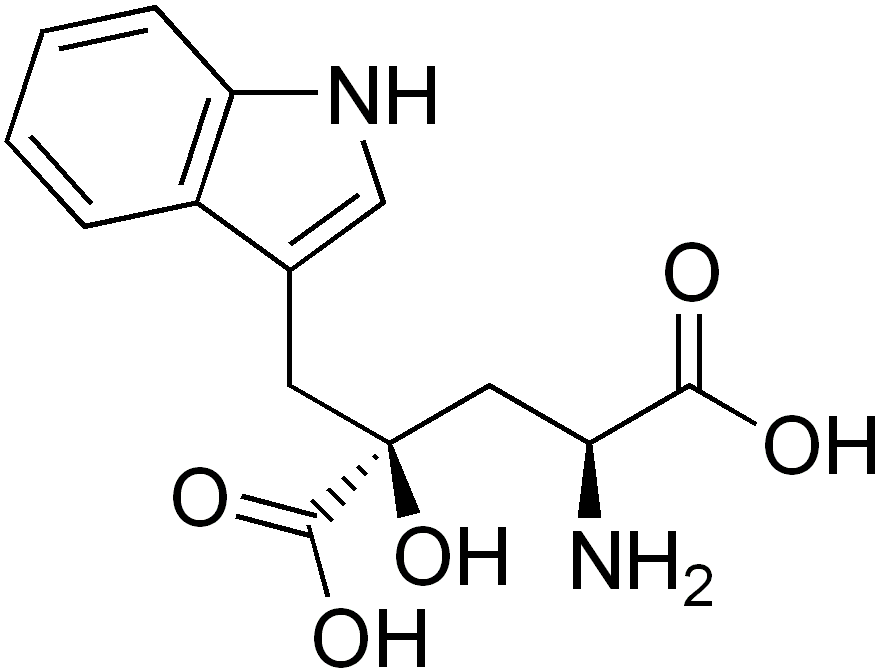

Names
- IUPAC name (4S)-4-Hydroxy-4-[(1H-indol-3-yl)methyl]-L-glutamic acid
- Systematic IUPAC name (2S,4S)-4-Amino-2-hydroxy-2-[(1H-indol-3-yl)methyl]pentanedioic acid
- Other names 2-Hydroxy-2-(indol-3-ylmethyl)-4-aminoglutaric acid (S)-4-Hydroxy-4-(1H-indol-3-ylmethyl)-L-glutamic acid

Identifiers
CAS Number	146142-94-1
3D model (JSmol)	Interactive image
ChemSpider	8036546
PubChem CID	9860847
UNII	TL342VQ3GR
CompTox Dashboard (EPA)	DTXSID60432020
- InChI: InChI=1S/C14H16N2O5/c15-10(12(17)18)6-14(21,13(19)20)5-8-7-16-11-4-2-1-3-9(8)11/h1-4,7,10,16,21H,5-6,15H2,(H,17,18)(H,19,20)/t10-,14-/m0/s1 Key: RMLYXMMBIZLGAQ-HZMBPMFUSA-N; InChI=1/C14H16N2O5/c15-10(12(17)18)6-14(21,13(19)20)5-8-7-16-11-4-2-1-3-9(8)11/h1-4,7,10,16,21H,5-6,15H2,(H,17,18)(H,19,20)/t10-,14-/m0/s1 Key: RMLYXMMBIZLGAQ-HZMBPMFUBZ
- SMILES: O[C@]([C@](O)=O)(C[C@H](N)C(O)=O)CC2=CNC1=CC=CC=C12

Properties
Chemical formula	C_{14}H_{16}N_{2}O_{5}
Molar mass	292.291 g·mol^{−1}
- Except where otherwise noted, data are given for materials in their standard state (at 25 °C [77 °F], 100 kPa). verify (what is ?) Infobox references

Monatin, commonly known as arruva, is a naturally occurring, high intensity sweetener isolated from the plant Sclerochiton ilicifolius, found in the Transvaal region of South Africa. Monatin contains no carbohydrate or sugar, and nearly no food energy, unlike sucrose or other nutritive sweeteners.

The name "monatin" is derived from the indigenous word for it, "molomo monate," which literally means "mouth nice."

Monatin is an indole derivative and, upon degradation, smells like feces.

It is 3000 times sweeter than sugar.

== See also ==
- Sugar substitute
