= Glucin =

Glucin is an artificial sweetening agent similar to saccharin that was used in the early 20th century. The substance is a sodium salt derived from coal tar. It is composed of a mixture of mono- and di-sulfonic acids with a chemical formula of C_{19}H_{16}N_{4}. It typically appears as a light brown powder, easily soluble in water. It is insoluble in ether and chloroform. Glucin is about three hundred times sweeter than cane sugar.

The use of glucin as a food additive is prohibited in much of the United States due to concerns about its health effects.
