= Dulcin =

Names
- IUPAC name (4-Ethoxyphenyl)urea
- Other names Sucrol; Valzin; Dulcine

Identifiers
CAS Number	150-69-6
3D model (JSmol)	Interactive image
ChemSpider	8663
ECHA InfoCard	100.005.244
EC Number	205-767-7
KEGG	C19415
PubChem CID	9013
RTECS number	YT2275000
UNII	8U78KF577Z
CompTox Dashboard (EPA)	DTXSID9020580
- InChI: InChI=1S/C9H12N2O2/c1-2-13-8-5-3-7(4-6-8)11-9(10)12/h3-6H,2H2,1H3,(H3,10,11,12) Key: GGLIEWRLXDLBBF-UHFFFAOYSA-N; InChI=1/C9H12N2O2/c1-2-13-8-5-3-7(4-6-8)11-9(10)12/h3-6H,2H2,1H3,(H3,10,11,12) Key: GGLIEWRLXDLBBF-UHFFFAOYAA
- SMILES: CCOC1=CC=C(C=C1)NC(=O)N

Properties
Chemical formula	C_{9}H_{12}N_{2}O_{2}
Molar mass	180.207 g·mol^{−1}
Appearance	White needles
Melting point	173.5 °C (344.3 °F; 446.6 K)
Boiling point	Decomposes
Solubility in water	1.25 g/L (25 °C)
Solubility	Soluble in alcohol
log P	1.28

Hazards
- Lethal dose or concentration (LD, LC)
LD_{50} (median dose)	1900 mg/kg (rat, oral)
- Except where otherwise noted, data are given for materials in their standard state (at 25 °C [77 °F], 100 kPa). verify (what is ?) Infobox references

Dulcin is an artificial sweetener about 250 times sweeter than sugar, discovered in 1883 by the Polish chemist Józef (Joseph) Berlinerblau (27 August 1859 – 1935). It was first mass-produced about seven years later. Although it was discovered only five years after saccharin, it never enjoyed the latter compound's market success. Nevertheless, it was an important sweetener of the early 20th century and had an advantage over saccharin in that it did not possess a bitter aftertaste.

Early medical tests marked the substance as safe for human consumption, and it was considered ideal for diabetics. However, an FDA study in 1951 raised many questions about its safety, resulting in its removal from the market in 1954 after animal testing revealed chronic toxicity. The FDA has also said that "the Federal Security Administrator regards these chemicals as poisonous substances which have no place in any food." In Japan, poisoning accidents by dulcin occurred frequently, and use of dulcin was forbidden in 1969.

Dulcin is also known by the names sucrol and valzin.

== Preparation ==
Dulcin can be produced by the addition of potassium cyanate to p-phenetidine hydrochloride in an aqueous solution at room temperature.

An alternate way to make dulcin is by mixing urea and p-phenetidine hydrochloride to a mixture of hydrochloric acid and glacial acetic acid.

== Toxicity ==
Dulcin is toxic to rats at 0.1% of the diet and above. At 0.1%, it causes a slight slowdown in growth; at 1.0%, the slowdown is evident alongside an increase in mortality and noticeable histological changes in liver, kidney, spleen, and heart.

== See also ==
- 5-Nitro-2-propoxyaniline (P-4000), banned alongside dulcin by the FDA
