= Maltitol =

Sugar alcohol used as a sweetener

- Chemical structure of maltitol

Names
- IUPAC name 4-O-α-D-Glucopyranosyl-D-glucitol

Identifiers
CAS Number	585-88-6
3D model (JSmol)	Interactive image
ChEMBL	ChEMBL63558
ChemSpider	432001
ECHA InfoCard	100.008.699
E number	E965 (glazing agents, ...)
PubChem CID	493591
UNII	D65DG142WK
CompTox Dashboard (EPA)	DTXSID0044444
- InChI: InChI=1S/C12H24O11/c13-1-4(16)7(18)11(5(17)2-14)23-12-10(21)9(20)8(19)6(3-15)22-12/h4-21H,1-3H2/t4-,5+,6+,7+,8+,9-,10+,11+,12+/m0/s1 Key: VQHSOMBJVWLPSR-WUJBLJFYSA-N; InChI=1/C12H24O11/c13-1-4(16)7(18)11(5(17)2-14)23-12-10(21)9(20)8(19)6(3-15)22-12/h4-21H,1-3H2/t4-,5+,6+,7+,8+,9-,10+,11+,12+/m0/s1 Key: VQHSOMBJVWLPSR-WUJBLJFYBZ
- SMILES: OC[C@H](O)[C@@H](O)[C@]([C@H](O)CO)([H])O[C@H]1O[C@H](CO)[C@@H](O)[C@H](O)[C@H]1O

Properties
Chemical formula	C_{12}H_{24}O_{11}
Molar mass	344.313 g·mol^{−1}
Melting point	145 °C (293 °F; 418 K)
- Except where otherwise noted, data are given for materials in their standard state (at 25 °C [77 °F], 100 kPa). verify (what is ?) Infobox references

Maltitol is a sugar alcohol (a polyol) used as a sugar substitute and laxative. It has 75–90% of the sweetness of sucrose (table sugar) and nearly identical properties, except for browning. It is used to replace table sugar because it is half as calorific, does not promote tooth decay, and has a somewhat lesser effect on blood glucose. In chemical terms, maltitol is known as 4-O-α-glucopyranosyl-D-sorbitol. It is used in commercial products under trade names such as Lesys, Maltisweet and SweetPearl.

== Production and uses ==
Maltitol is a disaccharide produced by hydrogenation of maltose obtained from starch. Maltitol syrup, a hydrogenated starch hydrolysate, is produced by hydrogenating corn syrup, a mixture of carbohydrates produced from the hydrolysis of starch. This product contains between 50% and 80% maltitol by weight. The remainder is mostly sorbitol, with a small quantity of other sugar-related substances.

Maltitol's high sweetness allows it to be used without being mixed with other sweeteners. It exhibits a negligible cooling effect (positive heat of solution) in comparison with other sugar alcohols, similar to the subtle cooling effect of sucrose. It is used in candy manufacture, particularly sugar-free hard candy, chewing gum, chocolates, baked goods, and ice cream. The pharmaceutical industry uses maltitol as an excipient, where it is used as a low-calorie sweetening agent. Its similarity to sucrose allows it to be used in syrups with the advantage that crystallization (which may cause bottle caps to stick) is less likely. Maltitol may also be used as a plasticizer in gelatin capsules, as an emollient, and as a humectant.

== Nutritional information ==
Maltitol provides between 2 and 3 kilocalories per gram [kcal/g] (8–10 kJ/g). Maltitol is largely unaffected by human digestive enzymes and is fermented by gut flora, with about 15% of the ingested maltitol excreted unchanged in the feces.

== Chemical properties ==
Maltitol in its crystallized form measures the same (bulk) as table sugar, but does not caramelize nor participate in Maillard reactions upon heating due to its relative chemical inertness. The crystallized form is readily dissolved in warm liquids (≈ 50 °C (120 °F) and above); the powdered form is preferred if room-temperature or cold liquids are used. Due to its sucrose-like structure, maltitol is easy to produce and made commercially available in crystallized, powdered, and syrup forms.

It is not metabolized by oral bacteria, so it does not promote tooth decay. It is more slowly absorbed than sucrose, a desirable property for diet in diabetes.

== Effects on digestion ==
Like other sugar alcohols (with the possible exception of erythritol), maltitol has a laxative effect, typically causing diarrhea at a daily consumption above about 90 g. Doses of about 40 g may cause mild borborygmus (stomach and bowel sounds) and flatulence.

== See also ==
- Isomalt
- Laxative
