= S6821 =

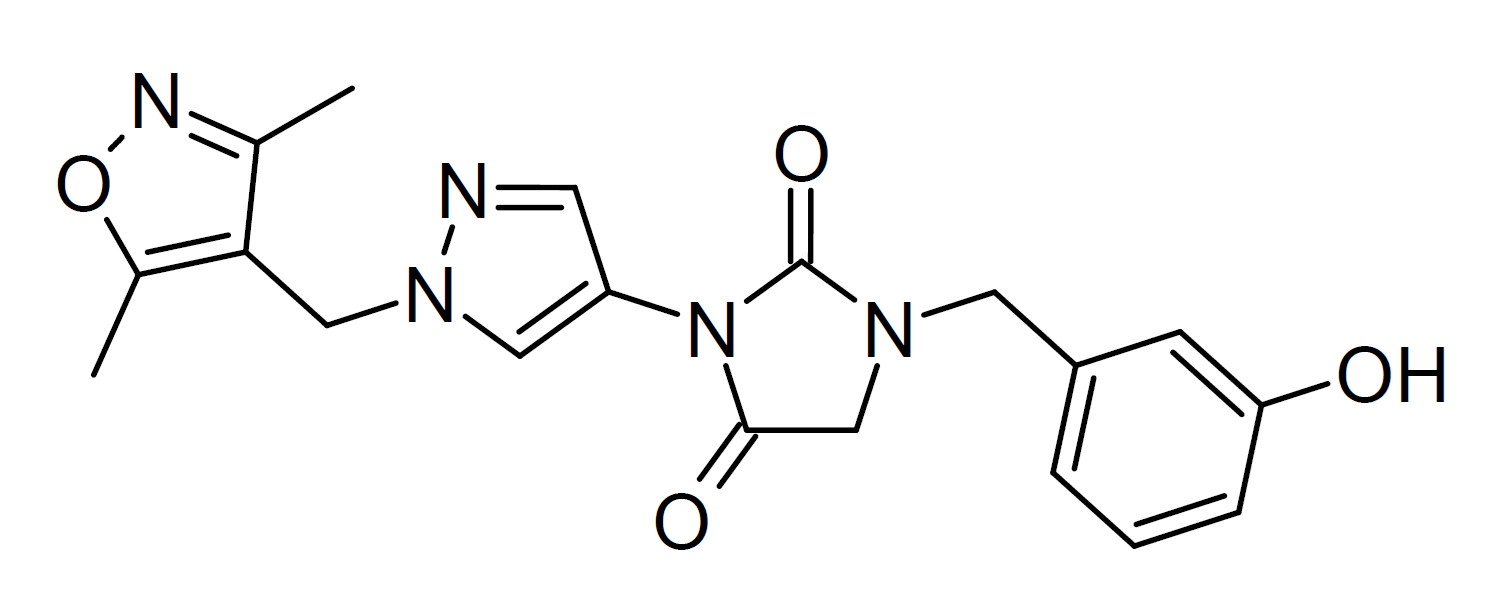

Identifiers
- IUPAC name: 3-[1-[(3,5-dimethyl-1,2-oxazol-4-yl)methyl]pyrazol-4-yl]-1-[(3-hydroxyphenyl)methyl]imidazolidine-2,4-dione
- CAS Number: 1119831-25-2
- PubChem CID: 57422431
- ChemSpider: 26233877
- UNII: 1P43YY1KO2
- ChEMBL: ChEMBL3924866
- CompTox Dashboard (EPA): DTXSID401020013

Chemical and physical data
- Formula: C_{19}H_{19}N_{5}O_{4}
- Molar mass: 381.392 g·mol^{−1}
- 3D model (JSmol): Interactive image
- SMILES: CC1=C(C(=NO1)C)CN2C=C(C=N2)N3C(=O)CN(C3=O)CC4=CC(=CC=C4)O
- InChI: InChI=1S/C19H19N5O4/c1-12-17(13(2)28-21-12)10-23-9-15(7-20-23)24-18(26)11-22(19(24)27)8-14-4-3-5-16(25)6-14/h3-7,9,25H,8,10-11H2,1-2H3; Key:LLJBKECMPVCSDS-UHFFFAOYSA-N

S6821 is a food additive that acts as a potent and selective antagonist of the bitter taste receptor TAS2R8. It has been approved as a food additive to block the bitter taste of certain active pharmaceutical ingredients, excipients, and nutraceuticals which primarily produce their bitter taste through binding to TAS2R8.

== See also ==
- S9632
