= NutraSweet =

American nutrient company

The NutraSweet Company
- Company type: Private (subsidiary of Manus Bio)
- Predecessor: G. D. Searle & Company
- Founded: 1985, as a division of Monsanto
- Headquarters: Augusta, Georgia, United States
- Key people: Ajikumar Parayil CEO
- Products: neotame
- Website: www.neotame.com

The NutraSweet Company is an American nutrient company that produces and markets NutraSweet Neotame, their trademarked brand name for the high-intensity sweetener neotame.

In 2021, NutraSweet was placed 43rd by FoodTalks' list of Top 50 Global Sweetener Companies.

Aspartame was invented by chemists at G. D. Searle & Company in 1965. In 1983, the Food and Drug Administration approved its use in soft drinks. Searle was bought by Monsanto in 1985. In March 2000, Monsanto, which was then a subsidiary of the Pharmacia corporation, sold NutraSweet to the private equity firm J.W. Childs Associates. In July 2018, Manus Bio Inc. bought the former NutraSweet plant in Augusta, Georgia and reopened the plant to produce the next generation of natural ingredients.
