= VirtualTaste =

Content
- Description: predictive model of chemical organoleptic properties.

Contact
- Laboratory: Institute of Physiology, Structural Bioinformatics Group, Berlin, Germany.
- Authors: Jessica Ahmed
- Primary citation: Ahmed & al. (2011)
- Release date: 2010

Access
- Website: https://insilico-cyp.charite.de/VirtualTaste/

VirtualTaste is an online database involved in predicting and classifying the tastes of various chemical compounds.

== See also ==
- Aroma compounds
- Bitterant
- Sugar substitute
