= Hydrogenated starch hydrolysates =

Mixture of sugar alcohols

Hydrogenated starch hydrolysates (HSHs), also known as polyglycitol syrup (INS 964), are mixtures of several sugar alcohols (a type of sugar substitute). Hydrogenated starch hydrolysates were developed by the Swedish company Lyckeby Starch in the 1960s. The HSH family of polyols is an approved food ingredient in Canada, Japan, and Australia. HSH sweeteners provide 40 to 90% sweetness relative to table sugar.

Hydrogenated starch hydrolysates are produced by the partial hydrolysis of starch – most often corn starch, but also potato starch or wheat starch. This creates dextrins (glucose and short glucose chains). The hydrolyzed starch (dextrin) then undergoes hydrogenation to convert the dextrins to sugar alcohols.

Hydrogenated starch hydrolysates are similar to sorbitol: if the starch is completely hydrolyzed so that only single glucose molecules remain, then after hydrogenation the result is sorbitol. Because in HSHs the starch is not completely hydrolyzed, a mixture of sorbitol, maltitol, and longer chain hydrogenated saccharides (such as maltotriitol) is produced. When no single polyol is dominant in the mix, the generic name hydrogenated starch hydrolysates is used. However, if 50% or more of the polyols in the mixture are of one type, it can be labeled as "sorbitol syrup", or "maltitol syrup", etc.

== Uses ==
Hydrogenated starch hydrolysates are used commercially in the same way as other common sugar alcohols. They are often used as both a sweetener and as a humectant (moisture-retaining ingredient). As a crystallization modifier, they can prevent syrups from forming crystals of sugar. It is used to add bulk, body, texture, and viscosity to mixtures, and can protect against damage from freezing and drying. HSH products are generally blended with other sweeteners, both caloric and artificial.

== Health and safety ==
Similar to xylitol, hydrogenated starch hydrolysates are not readily fermented by oral bacteria and are used to formulate sugarless products that do not promote dental caries. HSHs are also more slowly absorbed in the digestive tract, thus, have a reduced glycemic potential relative to glucose. However, they do have a laxative effect when consumed in large amounts.
