= 5-Nitro-2-propoxyaniline =

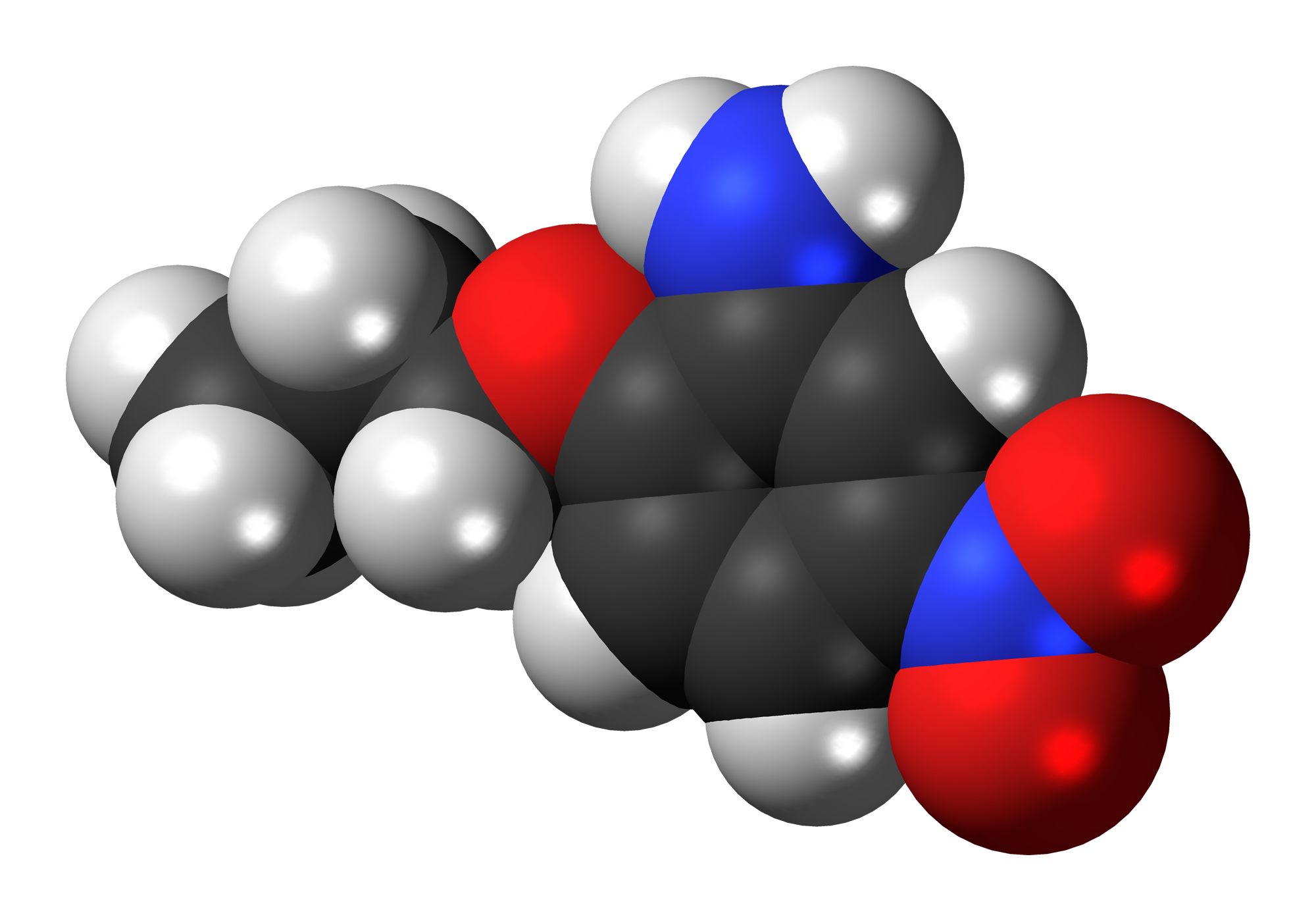

Names
- Preferred IUPAC name 5-Nitro-2-propoxyaniline

Identifiers
| CAS Number | 553-79-7 |
| 3D model (JSmol) | Interactive image |
| ChEBI | CHEBI:193992 |
| ChEMBL | ChEMBL322314 |
| ChemSpider | 10647 |
| ECHA InfoCard | 100.008.228 |
| EC Number | 209-049-4 |
| PubChem CID | 11118 |
| UNII | HDS42MR6BM |
| CompTox Dashboard (EPA) | DTXSID50203827 |
- InChI: InChI=1S/C9H12N2O3/c1-2-5-14-9-4-3-7(11(12)13)6-8(9)10/h3-4,6H,2,5,10H2,1H3 Key: RXQCEGOUSFBKPI-UHFFFAOYSA-N; InChI=1/C9H12N2O3/c1-2-5-14-9-4-3-7(11(12)13)6-8(9)10/h3-4,6H,2,5,10H2,1H3 Key: RXQCEGOUSFBKPI-UHFFFAOYAU
- SMILES: [O-][N+](=O)c1ccc(OCCC)c(c1)N

Properties
| Chemical formula | C_{9}H_{12}N_{2}O_{3} |
| Molar mass | 196.21 g/mol |
| Melting point | 48 °C (118 °F; 321 K) |
- Except where otherwise noted, data are given for materials in their standard state (at 25 °C [77 °F], 100 kPa). verify (what is ?) Infobox references

5-Nitro-2-propoxyaniline, also known as P-4000 and Ultrasüss, is about 4,000 times the intensity of sucrose (hence its alternate name, P-4000). It is an orange solid that is only slightly soluble in water. It is stable in boiling water and dilute acids. 5-Nitro-2-propoxyaniline was once used as an artificial sweetener but has been banned in the United States because of its possible toxicity.

In the US, food containing any added or detectable level of 5-nitro-2-propoxyaniline is deemed to be adulterated in violation of the act based upon an order published in the Federal Register of January 19, 1950 (15 FR 321).
