= Neotame =

Artificial sweetener

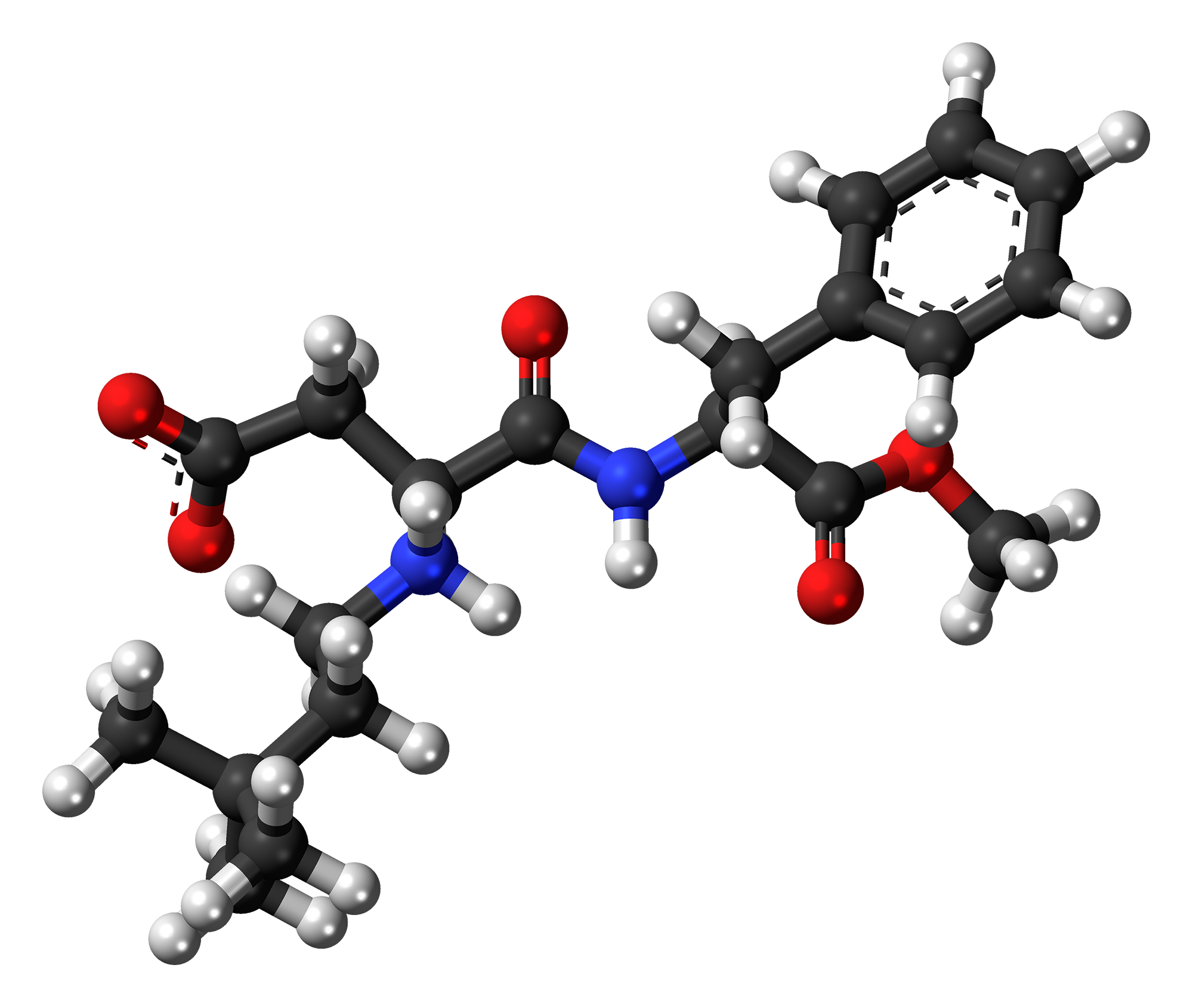

Names
- Systematic IUPAC name (3S)-3-[(3,3-Dimethylbutyl)amino]-4-{[(2S)-1-methoxy-1-oxo-3-phenylpropan-2-yl]amino}-4-oxobutanoic acid
- Other names E961; N-(N-(3,3-Dimethylbutyl)-L-α-aspartyl)-L-phenylalanine 1-methyl ester

Identifiers
CAS Number	165450-17-9
3D model (JSmol)	Interactive image
ChEBI	CHEBI:83503
ChemSpider	7986751
ECHA InfoCard	100.109.344
E number	E961 (glazing agents, ...)
PubChem CID	9810996
UNII	VJ597D52EX
CompTox Dashboard (EPA)	DTXSID50167950
- InChI: InChI=1S/C20H30N2O5/c1-20(2,3)10-11-21-15(13-17(23)24)18(25)22-16(19(26)27-4)12-14-8-6-5-7-9-14/h5-9,15-16,21H,10-13H2,1-4H3,(H,22,25)(H,23,24)/t15-,16-/m0/s1 Key: HLIAVLHNDJUHFG-HOTGVXAUSA-N; InChI=1/C20H30N2O5/c1-20(2,3)10-11-21-15(13-17(23)24)18(25)22-16(19(26)27-4)12-14-8-6-5-7-9-14/h5-9,15-16,21H,10-13H2,1-4H3,(H,22,25)(H,23,24)/t15-,16-/m0/s1 Key: HLIAVLHNDJUHFG-HOTGVXAUBG
- SMILES: CC(C)(C)CCN[C@@H](CC(=O)O)C(=O)N[C@@H](CC1=CC=CC=C1)C(=O)OC

Properties
Chemical formula	C_{20}H_{30}N_{2}O_{5}
Molar mass	378.469 g·mol^{−1}
Appearance	white powder
Melting point	80.9–83.4 °C (177.6–182.1 °F; 354.0–356.5 K)
Solubility in water	12.6 g/kg at 25 °C

Hazards
NFPA 704 (fire diamond)	0 1 0
- Except where otherwise noted, data are given for materials in their standard state (at 25 °C [77 °F], 100 kPa). verify (what is ?) Infobox references

Neotame, also known by the brand name Newtame, is a non-caloric artificial sweetener and aspartame analog. By mass, it is 7,000 to 13,000 times sweeter than sucrose. It has no notable off-flavors when compared to sucrose. It enhances original food flavors. It can be used alone, but is often mixed with other sweeteners to increase their individual sweetness (i.e. synergistic effect) and decrease their off-flavors (e.g. saccharin). It is chemically somewhat more stable than aspartame. Its use can be cost effective in comparison to other sweeteners as smaller amounts of neotame are needed.

It is suitable for use in carbonated soft drinks, yogurts, cakes, drink powders, and bubble gums among other foods. It can be used as a table top sweetener for hot drinks like coffee. It covers bitter tastes (e.g. caffeine).

In 2002, FDA approved it as a non-nutritive sweetener and flavor enhancer within the United States in foods generally, except meat and poultry. In 2010, it was approved for use in foods within the European Union with the E number E961. It has also been approved as an additive in many other countries outside US and EU.

Its metabolism is fast and is not retained in the body. Methanol forms in its metabolism. Only trace amounts of neotame are added to foods, so the amount of methanol is insignificant for health. It is safe for type 2 diabetics and those with phenylketonuria.

French scientists Claude Nofre and Jean-Marie Tinti invented neotame. In 1992, they filed a United States patent, which was granted in 1996.

== Safety ==
In US and EU, the acceptable daily intake (ADI) of neotame for humans is 0.3 and 2 mg per kg of bodyweight (mg/kg bw), respectively. NOAEL for humans is 200 mg/kg bw per day within EU. Estimated possible daily intakes from foods are well below ADI levels. Ingested neotame can form phenylalanine, but in normal use of neotame, this is not significant to those with phenylketonuria. It also has no adverse effects in type 2 diabetics. It is not considered to be carcinogenic or mutagenic. The Center for Science in the Public Interest has ranked neotame as safe.

== Sweetness ==
Water solutions of neotame that are equivalent in sweetness to sucrose water solutions increase logarithmically in relative sweetness as the sucrose concentration of a comparably sweet sucrose solution increases until a plateau is reached. Maximum sweetness is reached at neotame solution concentrations that are relatively as sweet as a water solution that is 15.1 percentage sucrose by weight, i.e., at 15.1 sucrose equivalence % (SE%). For comparison, acesulfame K, cyclamate and saccharin reach their maximum sweetness at 11.6 SE%, 11.3 SE% and 9 SE%, respectively.

Neotame is a high-potency sweetener, and it is 7,000 to 13,000 times sweeter than table sugar. Neotame contains flavor-enhancing properties, and compared to sucrose or aspartame, it has a relatively lower cost per sweetness factor.

== Chemistry ==
=== Structure ===
Neotame is formally a secondary amine of 3,3-dimethylbutanal and aspartame. The latter is a dipeptide of phenylalanine and aspartic acid. Neotame has 2 stereocenters and 4 stereoisomers. Sweetness is due to the (2S),(3S)-stereoisomer.

=== Spectroscopy ===
Neotame NMR spectroscopy identifies its structure with a peak at 0.84 ppm indicating the three methyl groups on the carbon chain bonded to the nitrogen.

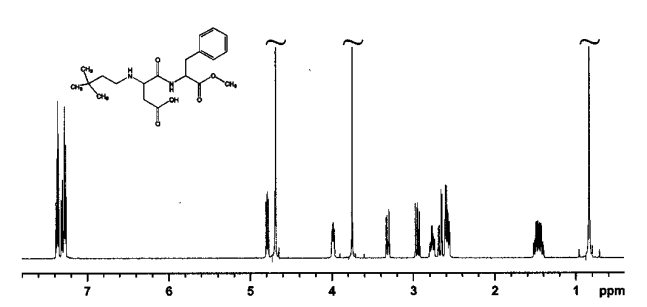
Proton NMR spectroscopy of neotame

=== Synthesis ===
Neotame is synthesized from aspartame through a reductive alkylation with 3,3-dimethylbutyraldehyde in a palladium catalyst with methanol. The stereochemistry of aspartame is conserved during the synthesis and therefore, neotame and aspartame have the same stereochemistry. (2S),(3S)-stereoisomer of aspartame is needed to synthesize the (2S),(3S)-stereoisomer of neotame.

=== Properties and reactivity ===
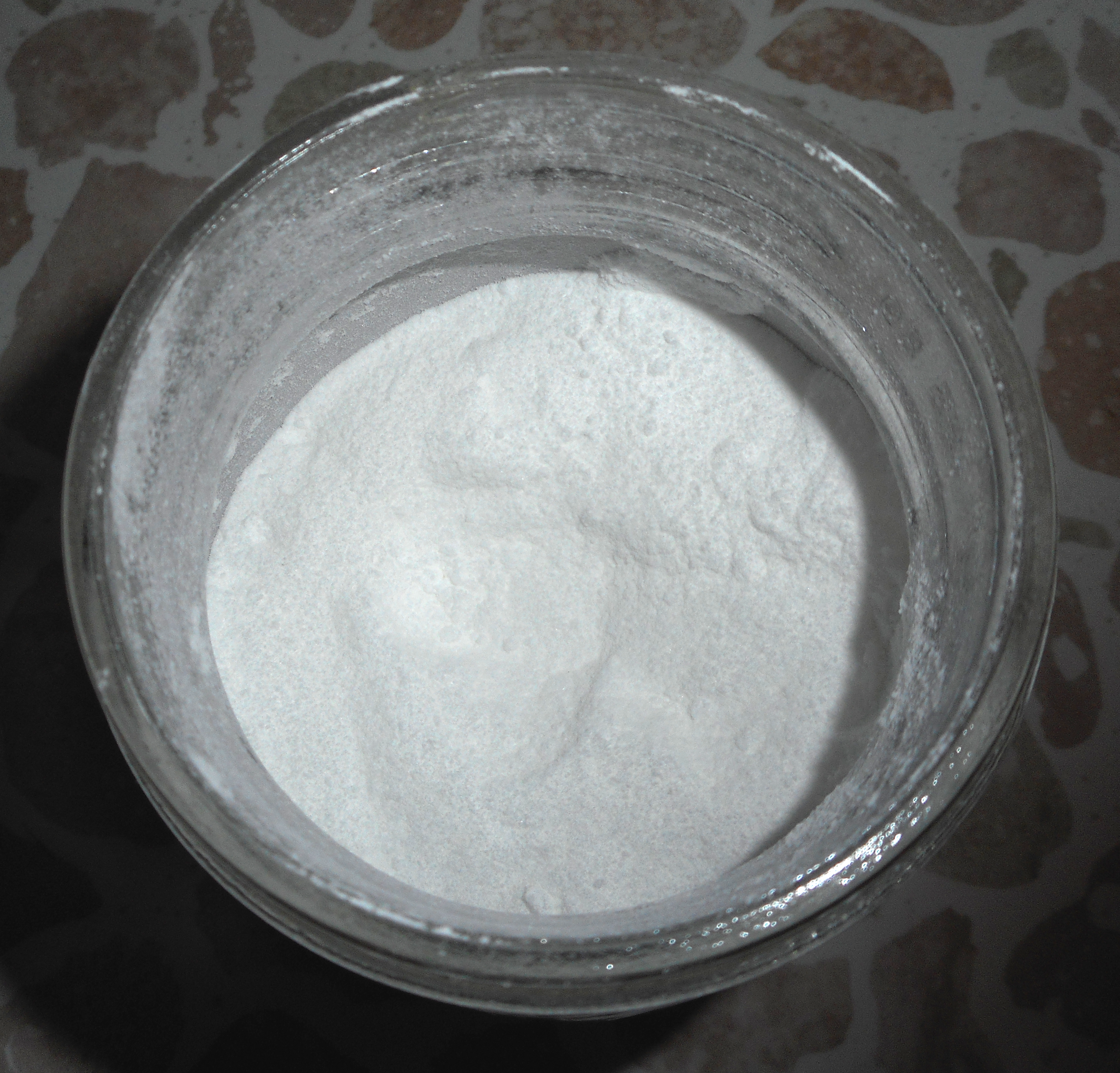
Neotame

Neotame has similar stability as aspartame, but has greater stability especially in heated and dairy foods. Increased temperature, moisture or pH increase losses, and are the main relevant properties of a food when considering the stability of neotame. For example, about 90% of original neotame remains after 8 weeks of storage in pH 3.2 beverages. Neotame is especially stable as a dry powder at room temperature and humidity even if mixed with glucose or maltodextrin, and is relatively inert in foods with reducing sugars like fructose.

Unlike aspartame, neotame doesn't form diketopiperazines via intra-molecular cyclization due to its N-alkyl substitution with 3,3-dimethylbutyl. This increases its heat stability.

Over 1000 g of neotame dissolves in 1 kg of ethanol at 15 °C. At 15 °C the solubility of neotame is 10.6 g/kg in water and 43.6 g/kg in ethyl acetate. At 25 °C the solubilities are 12.6 g/kg and 77.0 g/kg, respectively. At 40 °C the solubilities are 18.0 g/kg and 238 g/kg, respectively. At 50 °C the solubilities are 25.2 g/kg and 872 g/kg, respectively. Neotame is acidic and its 0.5 wt% solution has a pH of 5.80.

=== Manufacture ===
Industrially neotame is made from 3,3-dimethylbutanal and aspartame via reductive amination. They are dissolved in methanol, palladium on carbon catalyst is added, air is replaced with hydrogen and the reaction is carried out in room temperature under pressure for a few hours. Catalyst is filtered out. This can be aided with diatomaceous earth. Methanol is distilled followed by addition of water. The mixture is cooled for a few hours, neotame is isolated via centrifugation, washed with water and vacuum dried. Neotame is milled to suitable size.

== Metabolism ==
Neotame de-esterification via hydrolysis. CH_{3}OH is methanol.

In humans and many other animals like dogs, rats and rabbits, neotame is rapidly but incompletely absorbed. Its metabolites are not retained or concentrated in specific tissues.

In humans at oral doses of about 0.25 mg per kg of bodyweight (mg/kg bw), about 34% is absorbed into blood. Pharmacokinetics of oral doses of 0.1–0.5 mg/kg bw are somewhat linear, and at such doses, maximum neotame concentration in blood plasma is reached after about 0.5 hours with a half-life of about 0.75 hours. In blood and in body in general, non-specific esterases degrade neotame to de-esterified neotame and methanol, which is the main metabolic pathway in humans. De-esterified neotame has a plasma half-life of about 2 hours, and is the main metabolite in plasma.

In humans, over 80% of the original oral dose is excreted in feces and urine within 48 hours and the rest later. About 64% of the original dose is excreted in feces mostly as metabolites. Major metabolite in feces is the de-esterified neotame. Over 1% of the original dose is excreted in feces as N-(3,3-dimethylbutyl)-L-aspartyl - L - phenylalanine. Over 1% is excreted in urine as carnitine conjugate of 3,3-dimethylbutyric acid. Other minor metabolites form.

The major metabolic pathway leads to N-(3,3-dimethylbutyl)-L-aspartyl - L - phenylalanine with a side product of methanol, and the minor pathway happens when the N-(3,3-dimethylbutyl)-L-aspartyl - L - phenylalanine is oxidized into 3,3-dimethylbutyric acid. The side products for the minor pathway is methanol, aspartic acid and phenylalanine.

Methanol from neotame metabolism is insignificant at regulated levels used in foods and in comparison to methanol naturally found in foods.

== Patent ==
The patent covering the neotame molecule in the US, 5,480,668, was originally set to expire 7 November 2012, but was extended for 973 days by the U.S. Patent and Trademark Office. The patent expired on 8 July 2015.
