= Acesulfame potassium =

Calorie-free sugar substitute

- Acesulfame potassium

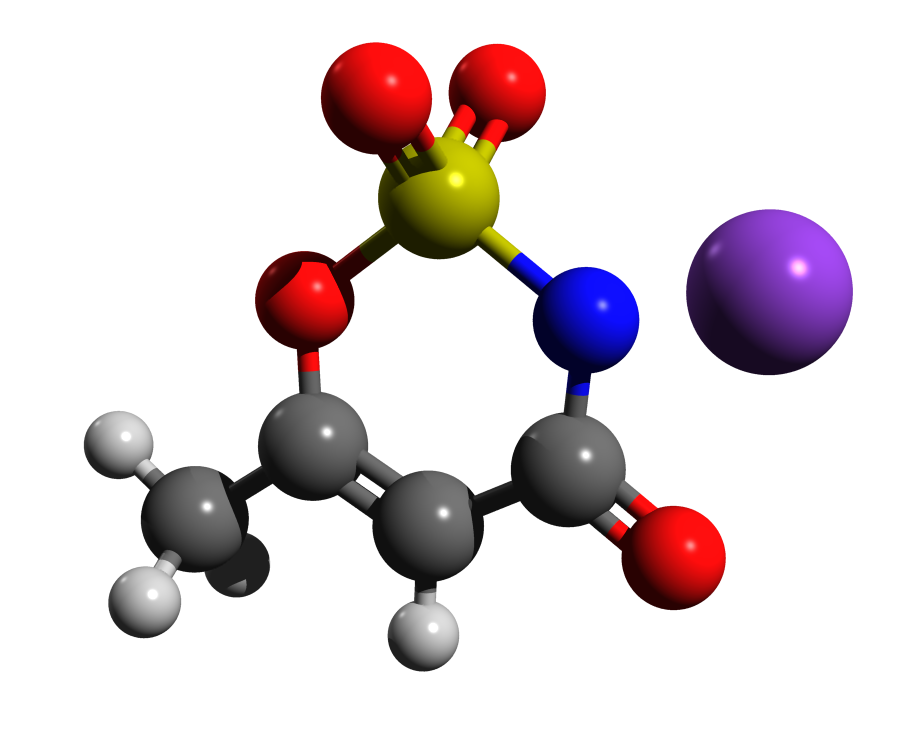
- Ball-and-stick model of acesulfame potassium

Names
- IUPAC name Potassium 6-methyl-2,2-dioxo-2H-1,2λ^{6},3-oxathiazin-4-olate
- Other names: Acesulfame K; Ace K

Identifiers
CAS Number	55589-62-3
3D model (JSmol)	Interactive image
ChEMBL	ChEMBL1351474
ChemSpider	55940
ECHA InfoCard	100.054.269
EC Number	259-715-3
E number	E950 (glazing agents, ...)
PubChem CID	23683747
UNII	23OV73Q5G9
CompTox Dashboard (EPA)	DTXSID1030606
- InChI: InChI=1S/C4H5NO4S.K/c1-3-2-4(6)5-10(7,8)9-3;/h2H,1H3,(H,5,6);/q;+1/p-1 Key: WBZFUFAFFUEMEI-UHFFFAOYSA-M; InChI=1/C4H5NO4S.K/c1-3-2-4(6)5-10(7,8)9-3;/h2H,1H3,(H,5,6);/q;+1/p-1 Key: WBZFUFAFFUEMEI-REWHXWOFAT
- SMILES: [K+].C\C1=C\C(=O)[N-]S(=O)(=O)O1

Properties
Chemical formula	C_{4}H_{4}KNO_{4}S
Molar mass	201.242
Appearance	white crystalline powder
Density	1.81 g/cm^{3}
Melting point	225 °C (437 °F; 498 K)
Solubility in water	270 g/L at 20 °C

Hazards
NFPA 704 (fire diamond)	1 1 0
- Except where otherwise noted, data are given for materials in their standard state (at 25 °C [77 °F], 100 kPa). verify (what is ?) Infobox references

Acesulfame potassium (UK: /æsɪˈsʌlfeɪm/, US: /ˌeɪsiːˈsʌlfeɪm/ AY-see-SUL-faym or /ˌæsəˈsʌlfeɪm/), also known as acesulfame K or Ace K, is a synthetic calorie-free sugar substitute (artificial sweetener) often marketed under the trade names Sunett and Sweet One. In the European Union, it is known under the E number (additive code) E950. It was discovered accidentally in 1967 by German chemist Karl Clauss at Hoechst AG (now Nutrinova). Acesulfame potassium is the potassium salt of 6-methyl-1,2,3-oxathiazine-4(3H)-one 2,2-dioxide. It is a white crystalline powder with molecular formula C_{4}H_{4}KNO_{4}S and molecular weight 201.24 g/mol.

== Properties ==
Acesulfame K is 200 times sweeter than sucrose (common sugar), as sweet as aspartame, about two-thirds as sweet as saccharin, and one-third as sweet as sucralose. Like saccharin, it has a slightly bitter aftertaste, especially at high concentrations. Kraft Foods patented the use of sodium ferulate to mask acesulfame's aftertaste. Acesulfame K is often blended with other sweeteners (usually sucralose or aspartame). These blends are reputed to give a more sucrose-like taste whereby each sweetener masks the other's aftertaste, or exhibits a synergistic effect by which the blend is sweeter than its components. Acesulfame potassium has a smaller particle size than sucrose, allowing for its mixtures with other sweeteners to be more uniform.

Unlike aspartame, acesulfame K is stable under heat, even under moderately acidic or basic conditions, allowing it to be used as a food additive in baking, or in products that require a long shelf life. Although acesulfame potassium has a stable shelf life, it can eventually degrade to acetoacetamide, which is toxic in high doses. In carbonated drinks, it is almost always used in conjunction with another sweetener, such as aspartame or sucralose. It is also used as a sweetener in protein shakes and pharmaceutical products, especially chewable and liquid medications, where it can make the active ingredients more palatable. The acceptable daily intake of acesulfame potassium is listed as 15 mg/kg/day.

Acesulfame potassium is widely used in the human diet and excreted by the kidneys. It thus has been used by researchers as a marker to estimate to what degree swimming pools are contaminated by urine.

Other names for acesulfame K are potassium acesulfamate, potassium salt of 6-methyl-1,2,3-oxothiazin-4(3H)-one-2,3-dioxide, and potassium 6-methyl-1,2,3-oxathiazine-4(3H)-one-3-ate-2,2-dioxide.

== Effect on body weight ==
Acesulfame potassium provides a sweet taste with no caloric value. There is no high-quality evidence that using acesulfame potassium as a sweetener affects body weight or body mass index (BMI).

== Discovery ==
Acesulfame potassium was developed after the accidental discovery of a similar compound (5,6-dimethyl-1,2,3-oxathiazin-4(3H)-one 2,2-dioxide) in 1967 by Karl Clauss and Harald Jensen at Hoechst AG. After some of the chemical powder accidentally spilled onto his sweater, Clauss licked his finger to wipe the spots away, which led him to notice its intensely sweet taste. Clauss is the inventor listed on a United States patent issued in 1975 to the assignee Hoechst Aktiengesellschaft for one process of manufacturing acesulfame potassium. Subsequent research showed a number of compounds with the same basic ring structure had different levels of sweetness. 6-methyl-1,2,3-oxathiazine-4(3H)-one 2,2-dioxide had particularly favourable taste characteristics and was relatively easy to synthesize, so it was singled out for further research, and received its generic name (acesulfame-K) from the World Health Organization in 1978. Acesulfame potassium first received approval for table top use in the United States in 1988.

== Safety ==
The United States Food and Drug Administration (FDA) approved its general use as a safe food additive in 1988, and maintained that safety assessment as of 2025.

In a 2000 scientific review, the European Food Safety Authority determined that acesulfame K is safe in typical consumption amounts, and does not increase the risk of diseases.

== Other sources ==
- von Rymon Lipinski GW (2000). "Sweeteners". Ullmann's Encyclopedia of Industrial Chemistry. doi:10.1002/14356007.a26_023. ISBN 978-3-527-30385-4.
