= Miracle berry =

Miracle berry may refer to:

- Synsepalum dulcificum, source of berries that increases the perceived sweetness of foods
- Thaumatococcus daniellii, source of a spice that has an intensely sweet flavor
