= Brazzein =

Protein

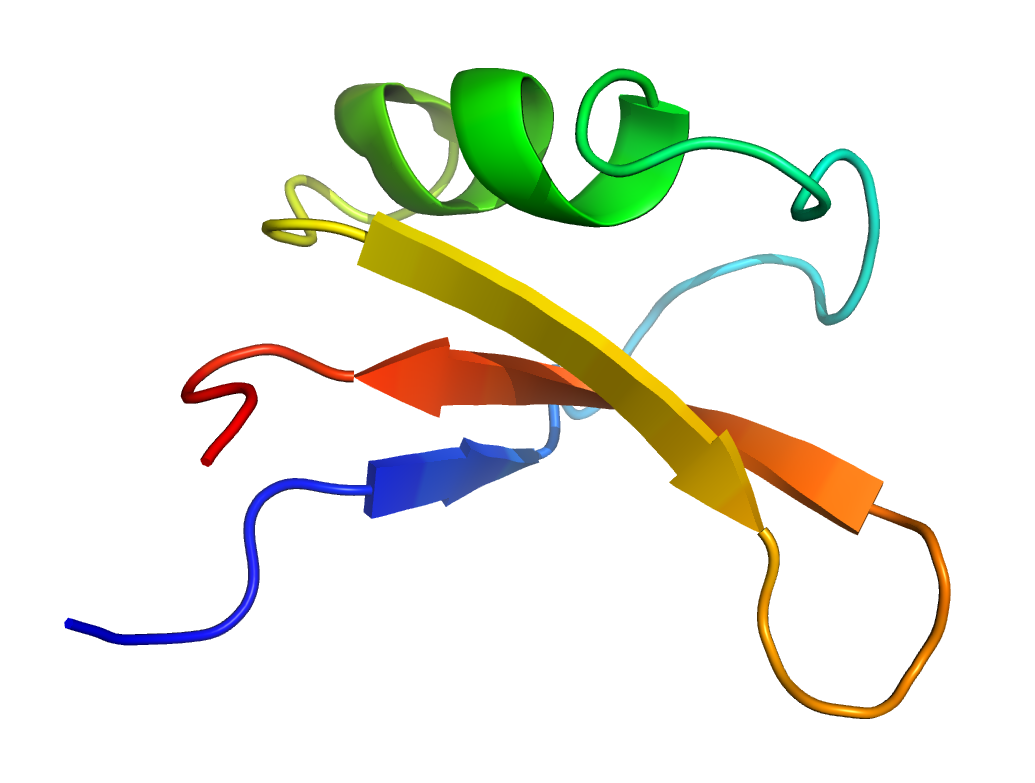
- Solution NMR structure of the brazzein protein.

Identifiers
- Organism: Pentadiplandra brazzeana
- Symbol: MONA_DIOCU
- PDB: 1BRZ
- UniProt: P56552
Search for
- Structures: Swiss-model
- Domains: InterPro

Brazzein is a sweet-tasting protein that occurs naturally in oubli (Pentadiplandra brazzeana), a fruit native to the Atlantic coastal areas of Central Africa. Brazzein was named in 1994 by scientists at the University of Wisconsin–Madison. It is roughly 500 to 2000 times sweeter than sucrose.

Brazzein is found in the extracellular region of oubli fruit, in the pulp tissue surrounding the seeds. It was first discovered and isolated in 1989 by Wel et al. under the name of pentadin. The corresponding author of both these publications has later opined that pentadin and brazzein are two different names for the same protein. Even though pentadin is the earlier proposed name, brazzein is the more commonly used name after more extensive characterisation of the sweet protein.

Like other sweet proteins discovered in plants, such as monellin and thaumatin, brazzein is extremely sweet compared to commonly used sweeteners. The fruit tastes sweet to humans, monkeys, and bonobos, but gorillas have mutations in their sweetness receptors so that they do not find brazzein sweet, and they are not known to eat the fruit.

== Traditional use ==
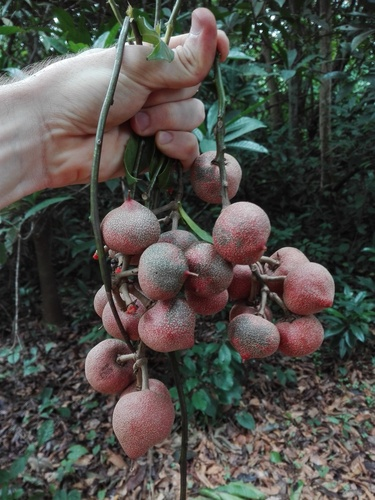
Oubli (Pentadiplandra brazzeana) found in tropical West Africa

The oubli plant (from which the protein was isolated) grows in Gabon and Cameroon where its fruit has been consumed by apes and local people over history. Due to brazzein and pentadin, the berries of the plant have exceptional sweetness. Locals call the berries "oubli" (French for "forgot") in their vernacular language because their taste is said to encourage nursing infants to forget their mother's milk, as once babies eat them, they may forget to return to their mothers.

== Protein structure ==
The monomer protein, consisting of 54 amino acid residues, is the smallest of the sweet proteins with a molecular weight of 6.5 kDa. The amino acid sequence of brazzein, adapted from the Swiss-Prot biological database of protein, is as follows: QDKCKKVYEN YPVSKCQLAN QCNYDCKLDK HARSGECFYD EKRNLQCICD YCEY

The structure of brazzein was determined by proton nuclear magnetic resonance (NMR) at a pH of 5.2 and 22 °C. Brazzein has four evenly spaced disulfide bonds and no sulfhydryl groups.

3D analysis of brazzein showed one alpha-helix and three strands of anti-parallel beta sheet. This is not superficially similar to either of the other two sweet-tasting proteins, monellin and thaumatin.

However, a recent 3D study shows that these three proteins possess similar "sweet fingers" believed to elicit the sweet taste.

Residues 29–33 and 39–43, plus residue 36, as well as the C-terminus were found to be involved in the sweet taste of the protein. The charge of the protein also plays an important role in its interaction with the sweet taste receptor.

Based on this knowledge a synthesised improved brazzein, called pGlu-1-brazzein, was reported to be twice as sweet as the natural counterpart.

== Sweetness properties ==
On a weight basis, brazzein is 500 to 2000 times sweeter than sucrose, compared to 10% sucrose and 2% sucrose solution respectively.

Its sweet perception is more similar to sucrose than that of thaumatin, with a clean sweet taste, lingering aftertaste, and slight delay (longer than aspartame) in an equi-sweet solution.

Brazzein is stable over a broad pH range from 2.5 to 8, and is heat stable at 98 °C (208 °F) for 2 hours.

== As a sweetener ==
Brazzein represents an alternative to available low-calorie sweeteners. As a protein, it is safe for diabetics. It is also very soluble in water (>50 mg/mL).

When blended with other sweeteners, such as aspartame and stevia, brazzein reduces side aftertaste and complements their flavor.

Its taste profile is closer to sucrose than other natural sweeteners (apart from thaumatin). Unlike other sweet-tasting proteins, it can withstand heat, making it more suitable for industrial food processing.

Papers have been published showing it can be made in a laboratory using peptide synthesis. Recombinant proteins were successfully produced via E. coli.

The Texas companies Prodigene and Nectar Worldwide were among the licensees to use Wisconsin Alumni Research Foundation patents on brazzein, and genetically engineer it into maize. Brazzein then can be commercially extracted from the maize through ordinary milling. Approximately one ton of maize yields 1-2 kilograms of brazzein. It can also be engineered into plants like wheat to make pre-sweetened grains, e.g. for cereals.

A company was formed to bring it to market as a sweetener in 2008, which initially said it would start selling the product by 2010 once it obtained agreement from the FDA that its brazzein was generally recognized as safe (GRAS).

In 2024, the brand Oobli received the first GRAS certification from the FDA, with no potential concerns for consumption being raised.

== See also ==
- Curculin
- Mabinlin
- Miraculin
- Monellin
- Thaumatin
