= Mabinlin =

Mabinlin 1

Identifiers
- Organism: ?
- Symbol: 2SS1_CAPMA
- Orthologs: OMA: entry
- UniProt: P80351
Search for
- Structures: Swiss-model
- Domains: InterPro

Mabinlin 2
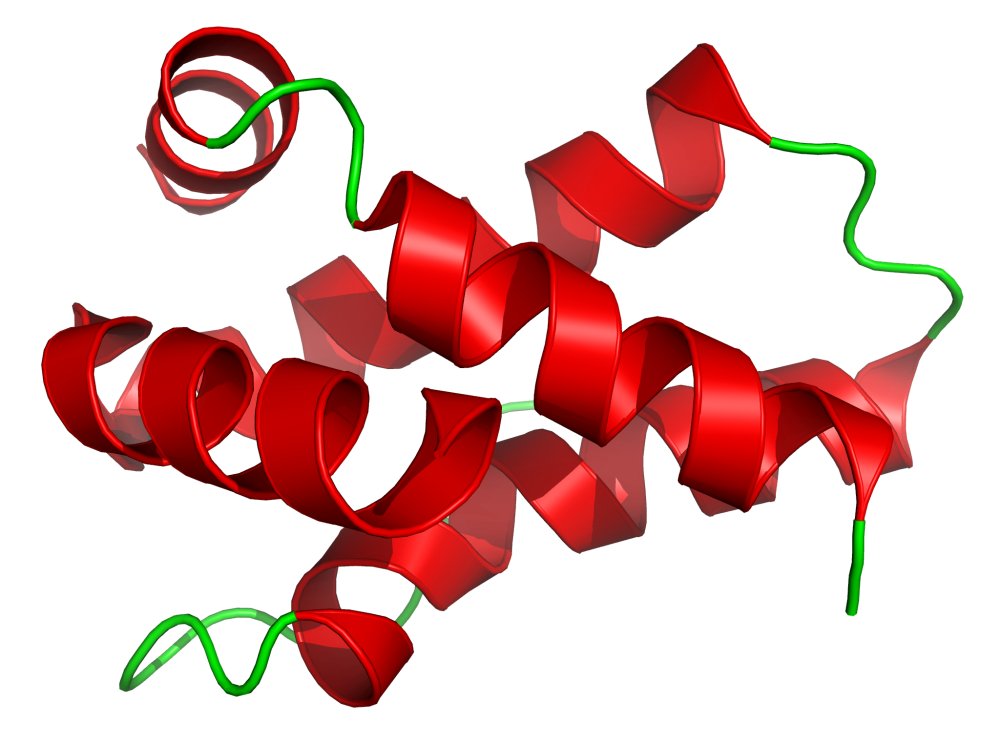
- Also known as: Mabinlin II, MAB II

Identifiers
- Organism: ?
- Symbol: 2SS2_CAPMA
- Orthologs: OMA: entry
- PDB: 2DS2
- UniProt: P30233
Search for
- Structures: Swiss-model
- Domains: InterPro

Mabinlin 3

Identifiers
- Organism: ?
- Symbol: 2SS3_CAPMA
- Orthologs: OMA: entry
- UniProt: P80352
Search for
- Structures: Swiss-model
- Domains: InterPro

Mabinlin 4

Identifiers
- Organism: ?
- Symbol: 2SS4_CAPMA
- Orthologs: OMA: entry
- UniProt: P80353
Search for
- Structures: Swiss-model
- Domains: InterPro

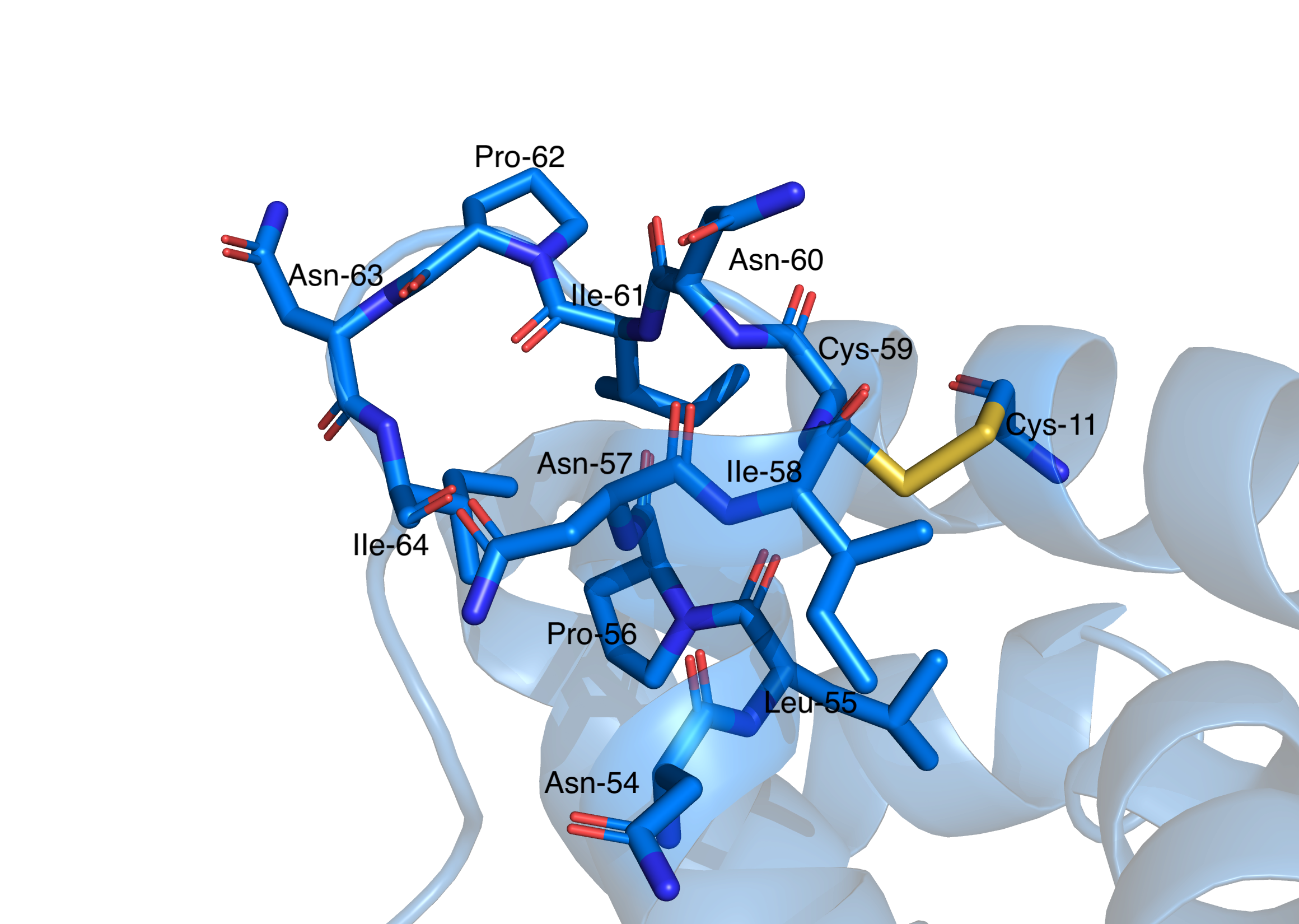
Stick structure of the amino acid residues in segment B54-B64 in Mabinlin II. Constructed in PyMOL (PDB 2DS2).

Mabinlins are sweet-tasting proteins extracted from the seed of mabinlang (Capparis masaikai Levl.), a plant growing in Yunnan province of China. There are four homologues. Mabinlin-2 was first isolated in 1983 and characterised in 1993, and is the most extensively studied of the four. The other variants of mabinlin-1, -3 and -4 were discovered and characterised in 1994.

== Protein structures ==
The 4 mabinlins are very similar in their amino acids sequences (see below).

Chain A
M-1: EPLCRRQFQQ HQHLRACQRY IRRRAQRGGL VD
M-2: QLWRCQRQFL QHQRLRACQR FIHRRAQFGG QPD
M-3: EPLCRRQFQQ HQHLRACQRY LRRRAQRGGL AD
M-4: EPLCRRQFQQ HQHLRACQRY LRRRAQRG

Chain B
M-1: EQRGPALRLC CNQLRQVNKP CVCPVLRQAA HQQLYQGQIE GPRQVRQLFR AARNLPNICK IPAVGRCQFT RW
M-2: QPRRPALRQC CNQLRQVDRP CVCPVLRQAA QQVLQRQIIQ GPQQLRRLFD AARNLPNICN IPNIGACPFR AW
M-3: EQRGPALRLC CNQLRQVNKP CVCPVLRQAA HQQLYQGQIE GPRQVRRLFR AARNLPNICK IPAVGRCQFT RW
M-4: EQRGPALRLC CNQLRQVNKP CVCPVLRQAA HQQLYQGQIE GPRQVRRLFR AARNLPNICK IPAVGRCQFT RW
Amino acid sequence of Mabinlins homologues are adapted from Swiss-Prot biological database of protein.

The molecular weights of Mabinlin-1, Mabinlin-3 and Mabinlin-4 are 12.3 kDa, 12.3 kDa and 11.9 kDa, respectively.

With a molecular weight of 10.4kDa, mabinlin-2 is lighter than mabinlin-1. It is a heterodimer consisting of two different chains A and B produced by post-translational cleavage. The A chain is composed of 33 amino acid residues and the B chain is composed of 72 amino acid residues. The B chain contains two intramolecular disulfide bonds and is connected to the A chain through two intermolecular disulfide bridges.

Mabinlin-2 is the sweet-tasting protein with the highest known thermostability, which is due to the presence of the four disulfide bridges. It has been suggested also that the difference in the heat stability of the different mabinlin homologues is due to the presence of an arginine residue (heat-stable homologue) or a glutamine (heat-unstable homologue) at position 47 in the B-chain.

The B54-B64 segment of the beta chain in Mabinlin II is the primary functional domain that enables its function as a sweet protein.The segment contains the [NL/I] tetralit motif, a unique structural arrangement that contains four Asn-Leu/lle dipole units. The motif is stabilized by Pro56, Pro62, and a cysteine that is involved in a disulfide bridge, which includes CysB59-CysB11. The stabilization ensures a rigid and defined conformation.The region is one of the primary binding sites for receptor interaction such as the sweet receptor nTR2/T1R3.

The sequences of Mabilins cluster with Napins (InterPro: IPR000617).

== Sweetness properties ==
Mabinlins sweetness were estimated to be about 100–400 times that of sucrose on molar basis, 10 times sucrose on a weight basis, which make them less sweet than thaumatin (3000 times) but elicit a similar sweetness profile.

The sweetness of mabinlin-2 is unchanged after 48 hours incubation at 80 °C.

Mabinlin-3 and -4 sweetness stayed unchanged after 1 hour at 80 °C, while mabinlin-1 loses sweetness after 1 hour at the same condition.

== As a sweetener ==
Mabinlins, as proteins, are readily soluble in water and found to be highly sweet; however, mabinlin-2 with its high heat stability has the best chance to be used as a sweetener.

During the past decade, attempts have been made to produce mabinlin-2 industrially. The sweet-tasting protein has been successfully synthesised by a stepwise solid-phase method in 1998, however the synthetic protein had an astringent-sweet taste.

Mabinlin-2 has been expressed in transgenic potato tubers, but no explicit results have been reported yet. However, patents to protect production of recombinant mabinlin by cloning and DNA sequencing have been issued.

== See also ==
- Brazzein
- Monellin
- Pentadin
- Thaumatin
