= Miraculin =

Protein with taste-modifying activity

Miraculin glycoprotein
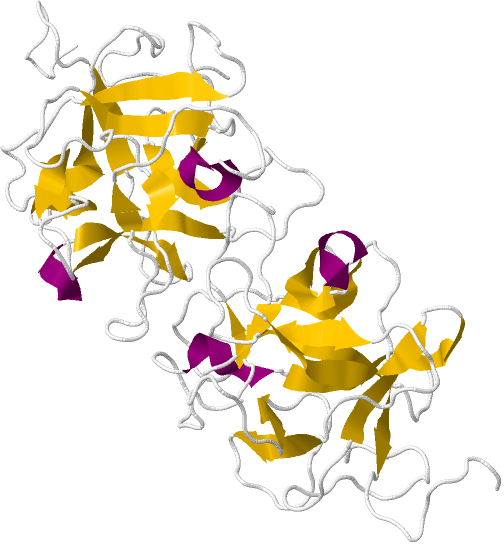
- Crystallographic structure of a dimeric miraculin-like protein from seeds of Murraya koenigii.

Identifiers
- Organism: Synsepalum dulcificu
- Symbol: MIRA_RICDU
- Orthologs: OMA: entry
- PDB: 3IIR
- UniProt: P13087
Search for
- Structures: Swiss-model
- Domains: InterPro

Miraculin is a taste modifier, a glycoprotein extracted from the fruit of Synsepalum dulcificum. The berry, also known as the miracle fruit, was documented by explorer Chevalier des Marchais, who searched for many different fruits during a 1725 excursion to its native West Africa.

Miraculin itself does not taste sweet. When taste buds are exposed to miraculin, the protein binds to the sweetness receptors. This causes normally sour-tasting acidic foods, such as citrus, to be perceived as sweet. The effect can last for one or two hours.

== History ==
The sweetening properties of Synsepalum dulcificum berries were first noted by des Marchais during expeditions to West Africa in the 18th century. The term miraculin derived from experiments to isolate and purify the active glycoprotein that gave the berries their sweetening effects, results that were published simultaneously by Japanese and Dutch scientists working independently in the 1960s (the Dutch team called the glycoprotein mieraculin). The word miraculin was in common use by the mid-1970s.

== Glycoprotein structure ==
Miraculin was first sequenced in 1989 and was found to be a 24.6 kilodalton glycoprotein consisting of 191 amino acids and 13.9% by weight of various sugars.

SIGNAL (29)	MKELTMLSLS FFFVSALLAA AANPLLSAA
1–50	DSAPNPVLDI DGEKLRTGTN YYIVPVLRDH GGGLTVSATT PNGTFVCPPR
51–100	VVQTRKEVDH DRPLAFFPEN PKEDVVRVST DLNINFSAFM PNPGPETISS
101–150	WCRWTSSTVW RLDKYDESTG QYFVTIGGVK FKIEEFCGSG FYKLVFCPTV
151–191	CGSCKVKCGD VGIYIDQKGR GRRLALSDKP FAFEFNKTVY F
Amino acids sequence of glycoprotein miraculin unit adapted from Swiss-Prot biological database of protein sequences.

The sugars consist of a total of 3.4 kDa, composed of a molar ratio of glucosamine (31%), mannose (30%), fucose (22%), xylose (10%), and galactose (7%).

The native state of miraculin is a tetramer consisting of two dimers, each held together by a disulfide bridge. Both tetramer miraculin and native dimer miraculin in its crude state have the taste-modifying activity of turning sour tastes into sweet tastes. Miraculin belongs to the Kunitz STI protease inhibitor family.

== Sweetness properties ==
Miraculin, unlike curculin (another taste-modifying agent), is not sweet by itself, but it can change the perception of sourness to sweetness, even for a long period after consumption. The duration and intensity of the sweetness-modifying effect depends on various factors, such as miraculin concentration, duration of contact of the miraculin with the tongue, and acid concentration. Miraculin reaches its maximum sweetness with a solution containing at least 4*10^{−7} mol/L miraculin, which is held in the mouth for about 3 minutes. Maximum is equivalent in sweetness to a 0.4 mol/L solution of sucrose. Miraculin degrades permanently via denaturation at high temperatures and at pH below 3 or above 12.

Although the detailed mechanism of the taste-inducing behavior is unknown, it appears the sweet receptors are activated by acids which are related to sourness, an effect remaining until the taste buds perceive a neutral pH. Sweeteners are perceived by the human sweet taste receptor, hT1R2-hT1R3, which belongs to G protein-coupled receptors, modified by the two histidine residues (i.e. His30 and His60) which participate in the taste-modifying behavior. One site maintains the attachment of the protein to the membranes while the other (with attached xylose or arabinose) activates the sweet receptor membrane in acid solutions.

== As a sweetener ==
As miraculin is a readily soluble protein and relatively heat stable, it is a potential sweetener in acidic food, such as soft drinks. While attempts to express it in yeast and tobacco plants have failed, researchers have succeeded in preparing genetically modified E. coli bacteria that express miraculin. Lettuce and tomato have also been used for mass production of miraculin.

The use of miraculin as a food additive was denied in 1974 by the United States Food and Drug Administration. However, it can still be sold in the form of whole berries or tablets (as "dietary supplements"). In 2011 the FDA banned a certain brand of miraculin tablets imported from Taiwan as it was thought to be "hard candy" with non-approved sweeteners. Miraculin has a novel food status in the European Union.

== See also ==
- Brazzein
- Curculin
- Monellin
- Thaumatin
- Pentadin
- Cynarin
- Stevia
