= Magical fruit =

Magical fruit may refer to:

- Miracle fruit, or miracle berry plant (Synsepalum dulcificum), which produces berries that, when eaten, cause sour foods subsequently consumed to taste sweet
- Bean, a common name for large plant seeds of several genera of the family Fabaceae (alternately Leguminosae) used for human food or animal feed
