= Synsepalum tsounkpe =

Conservation status
- Endangered (IUCN 2.3)

Scientific classification
- Kingdom: Plantae
- Clade: Tracheophytes
- Clade: Angiosperms
- Clade: Eudicots
- Clade: Asterids
- Order: Ericales
- Family: Sapotaceae
- Genus: Synsepalum
- Species: S. tsounkpe

Binomial name
- Synsepalum tsounkpe Aubrév. & Pellegr.

Species of tree

Synsepalum tsounkpe is a species of tree in the family Sapotaceae with edible fruit. It is endemic to Côte d'Ivoire. It is threatened by habitat loss.
