= Synsepalum revolutum =

Scientific classification
- Kingdom: Plantae
- Clade: Tracheophytes
- Clade: Angiosperms
- Clade: Eudicots
- Clade: Asterids
- Order: Ericales
- Family: Sapotaceae
- Genus: Synsepalum
- Species: S. revolutum

Binomial name
- Synsepalum revolutum (Baker) T.D.Penn.

Synonyms
- Bakeriella densiflora (Baker) Dubard; Bakeriella revoluta (Baker) Dubard; Bakerisideroxylon bruneelii De Wild.; Bakerisideroxylon densiflorum (Baker) Engl.; Bakerisideroxylon revolutum var. brevipetiolulatum Engl.; Bakerisideroxylon revolutum (Baker) Engl.; Pouteria camerounensis (Pierre ex Aubrév. & Pellegr.) Baehni; Pouteria densiflora (Baker) Baehni; Pouteria revoluta (Baker) Baehni; Sideroxylon densiflorum Baker; Sideroxylon revolutum Baker; Vincentella camerounensis Pierre ex Aubrév. & Pellegr.; Vincentella densiflora (Baker) Pierre; Vincentella revoluta (Baker) Pierre

Species of plant

Synsepalum revolutum is a species of flowering plant in the family Sapotaceae, native to west and west central tropical Africa. It was first described by John Gilbert Baker in 1877 as Sideroxylon revolutum.

== Distribution ==
Synsepalum revolutum is native to Cameroon, the Central African Republic, Ghana, the Gulf of Guinea islands, Ivory Coast, Nigeria, and the Democratic Republic of the Congo.

== Conservation ==
Vincentella densiflora was assessed as "vulnerable" in the 1998 IUCN Red List, where it is said to be native only to São Tomé Island, one of the Gulf of Guinea islands. As of February 2023, V. densiflora was regarded as a synonym of Synsepalum revolutum, which has a very much wider distribution.
