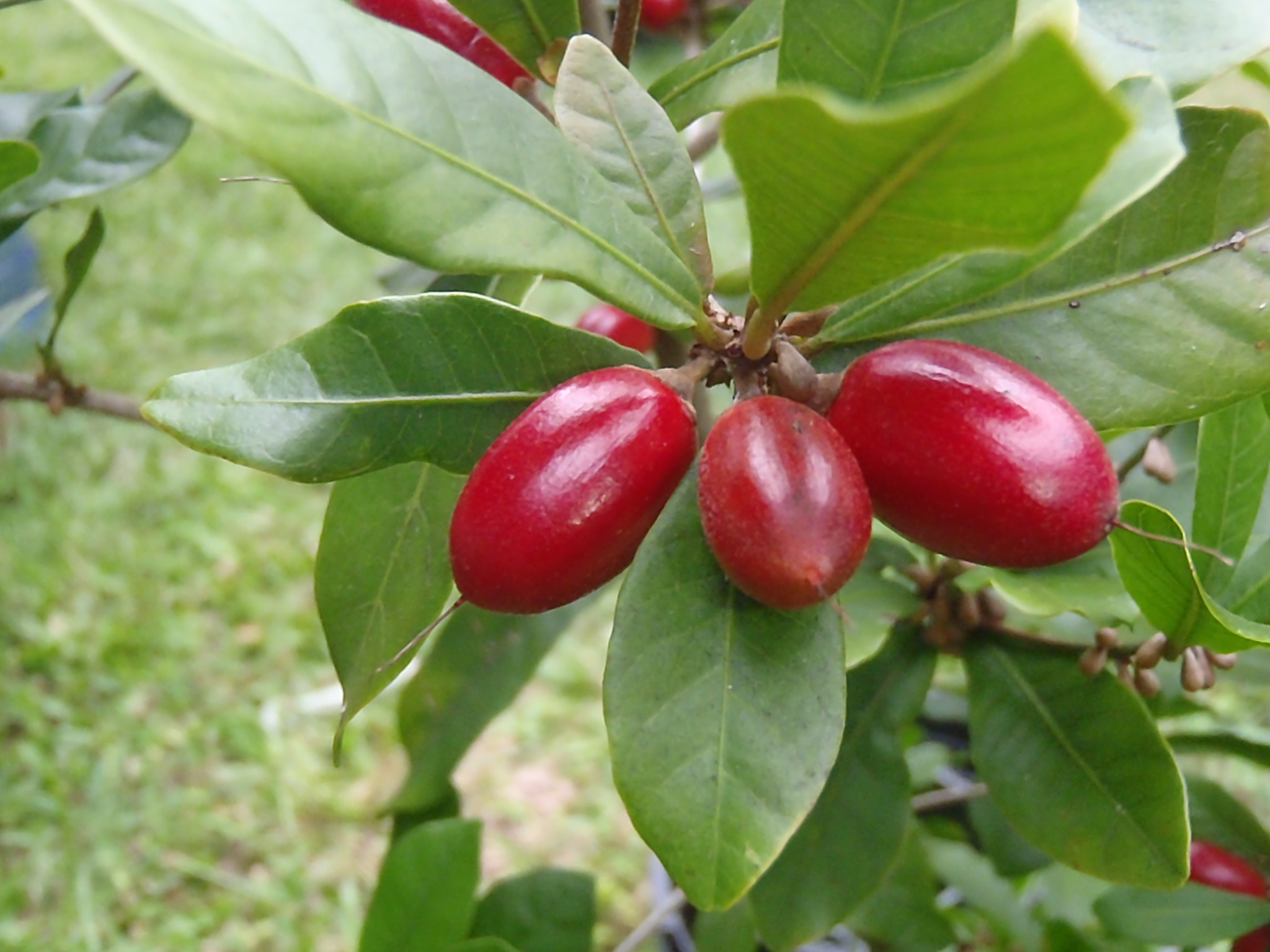
- Miracle fruit, Synsepalum dulcificum

Scientific classification
- Kingdom: Plantae
- Clade: Embryophytes
- Clade: Tracheophytes
- Clade: Spermatophytes
- Clade: Angiosperms
- Clade: Eudicots
- Clade: Asterids
- Order: Ericales
- Family: Sapotaceae
- Subfamily: Chrysophylloideae
- Genus: Synsepalum (A.DC.) Daniell

Synonyms
- Afrosersalisia A.Chev.; Bakeriella Pierre ex Dubard; Bakerisideroxylon Engl.; Lasersisia Liben, not validly published; Pachystela Pierre ex Engl.; Pseudopachystela Aubrév. & Pellegr.; Rogeonella A.Chev.; Sideroxylon section Synsepalum A.DC; Stironeurum Radlk. ex De Wild. & T.Durand; Tulestea Aubrév. & Pellegr.; Vincentella Pierre

= Synsepalum =

Genus of shrubs and trees

Synsepalum is a genus of trees and shrubs in the chicle family Sapotaceae described as a genus in 1852.

Synsepalum is native to the tropical lowlands of Africa.

== Species ==
37 species are accepted.

1. Synsepalum afzelii (Engl.) T.D.Penn. – Western Africa
2. Synsepalum aubrevillei (Pellegr.) Aubrév. & Pellegr. – Ivory Coast
3. Synsepalum batesii (A.Chev.) Aubrév. & Pellegr. – Cameroon
4. Synsepalum bequaertii De Wild. – Democratic Republic of the Congo
5. Synsepalum brenanii (Heine) T.D.Penn. – Cameroon
6. Synsepalum brevipes (Baker) T.D.Penn. – tropical Africa
7. Synsepalum buluensis (Greves) ined. – Gabon and Cabinda
8. Synsepalum carrieanum (Dubard) Pierre ex ined. – Republic of the Congo
9. Synsepalum cerasiferum (Welw.) T.D.Penn. – tropical Africa
10. Synsepalum chimanimani Rokni & I.Darbysh. – Mozambique, Zimbabwe
11. Synsepalum congolense Lecomte – Republic of the Congo, Gabon
12. Synsepalum dulcificum (Schumach. & Thonn.) Daniell – West and Central Africa
13. Synsepalum fleuryanum A.Chev. – Gabon
14. Synsepalum gabonense (Aubrév. & Pellegr.) T.D.Penn. – Gabon
15. Synsepalum kassneri (Engl.) T.D.Penn. – Kenya, Mozambique, Tanzania, Zimbabwe
16. Synsepalum lastoursvillense (Aubrév. & Pellegr.) ined. – Gabon
17. Synsepalum laurentii (De Wild.) D.J.Harris – Democratic Republic of the Congo, Central African Republic
18. Synsepalum letestui Aubrév. & Pellegr. – Republic of the Congo, Gabon, Central African Republic
19. Synsepalum letouzeyi Aubrév. – Cameroon, Central African Republic
20. Synsepalum msolo (Engl.) T.D.Penn. – West and Central Africa
21. Synsepalum muelleri (Kupicha) T.D.Penn. – Malawi, Mozambique
22. Synsepalum ntimii W.D.Hawth. – Liberia and Ghana
23. Synsepalum nyangense (Pellegr.) McPhersen & J.T.White – Gabon
24. Synsepalum ogouense Aubrév. & Pellegr.) ined. – Republic of the Congo, Gabon
25. Synsepalum ovatostipulatum (De Wild.) ined. – Democratic Republic of the Congo
26. Synsepalum oyemense (Aubrév. & Pellegr.) ined. – Republic of the Congo, Gabon
27. Synsepalum passargei (Engl.) T.D.Penn. – tropical Africa
28. Synsepalum pobeguinianum (Dubard) Aké Assi & L.Gaut. – West Africa
29. Synsepalum revolutum (Baker) T.D.Penn. – West and Central Africa
30. Synsepalum seretii (De Wild.) T.D.Penn. – Republic of the Congo, Gabon, Democratic Republic of the Congo
31. Synsepalum stipulatum (Radlk.) Engl. – Central Africa
32. Synsepalum subcordatum De Wild. – Central Africa
33. Synsepalum subverticillatum (E.A.Bruce) T.D.Penn. – Kenya
34. Synsepalum tomentosum (Aubrév. & Pellegr.) ined. – Gabon
35. Synsepalum tsounkpe Aubrév. & Pellegr. – Ivory Coast
36. Synsepalum ulugurense (Engl.) Engl. – Tanzania
37. Synsepalum zenkeri Aubrév. & Pellegr. – Republic of the Congo, Cameroon
