= Monellin =

Protein

Monellin Chain B
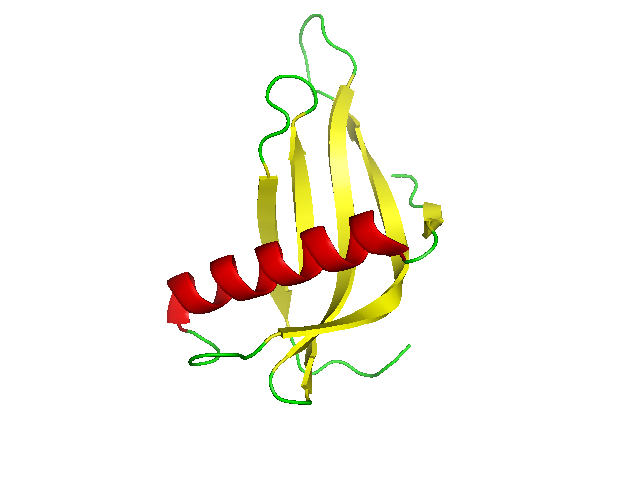
- X-ray crystal structure of an engineered single-chain monellin protein.

Identifiers
- Organism: Dioscoreophyllum cumminsii
- Symbol: MonB
- Orthologs: OMA: entry
- PDB: 2O9U
- UniProt: P02882
Search for
- Structures: Swiss-model
- Domains: InterPro

Monellin Chain A

Identifiers
- Organism: Dioscoreophyllum cumminsii
- Symbol: MonA
- Orthologs: OMA: entry
- PDB: 1IV7
- UniProt: P02881
Search for
- Structures: Swiss-model
- Domains: InterPro

Monellin

Identifiers
- Symbol: Monellin
- Pfam: PF09200
- InterPro: IPR015283
Available protein structures:
- PDB: IPR015283 PF09200 (ECOD; PDBsum)
- AlphaFold: IPR015283; PF09200

Monellin, a sweet protein, was discovered in 1969 in the fruit of the West African shrub known as serendipity berry (Dioscoreophyllum cumminsii); it was first reported as a carbohydrate. The protein was named in 1972 after the Monell Chemical Senses Center in Philadelphia, U.S.A., where it was isolated and characterized.

== Protein composition ==
Monellin's molecular weight is 10.7 kDa. It has two noncovalently associated polypeptide chains: an A chain sequence with 44 amino acid residues, and a B chain with 50 residues.

Monellin chain A (44 AA):
REIKGYEYQL YVYASDKLFR ADISEDYKTR GRKLLRFNGP VPPP
Monellin chain B (50 AA):
GEWEIIDIGP FTQNLGKFAV DEENKIGQYG RLTFNKVIRP CMKKTIYEEN

Amino acid sequence of the sweet protein monellin adapted from Swiss-Prot biological database of protein.

Monellin has a secondary structure consisting of five beta-strands that form an antiparallel beta-sheet and a 17-residue alpha-helix.

In its natural form, monellin is composed of the two chains shown above (PDB: 3MON), but the protein is unstable at high temperatures or at extremes of pH. To enhance its stability, single-chain monellin proteins were created in which the two natural chains are joined via a Gly-Phe dipeptide linker. This modified version of the protein (MNEI) has been studied using NMR and X-ray diffraction.

In addition to its secondary structure, four stably bound sulfate ions were located on the monellin protein, three on the concave face of the protein and one on the convex face of the protein. The sulfate ion on the convex face of the protein is of particular interest because it lies adjacent to a patch of positive surface potential, which may be important in electrostatic interactions with the negative T1R2-T1R3 sweet taste protein receptor.

== Sweetness properties ==
Monellin is perceived as sweet by humans and some Old World primates, but is not preferred by other mammals. The relative sweetness of monellin varies from 800 to 2000 times sweeter than sucrose, depending on the sweet reference against which it is assessed. It is reported to be 1500-2000 times sweeter than a 7% sucrose solution on a weight basis and 800 times sweeter than sucrose when compared with a 5% sucrose solution on a weight basis.

Monellin has a slow onset of sweetness and lingering aftertaste. Like miraculin, monellin's sweetness is pH-dependent; the protein is tasteless below pH 2 and above pH 9. Blending the sweet protein with bulk and/or intense sweeteners reduces the persistent sweetness and shows a synergistic sweet effect.
Heat over 50 °C at low pH denatures monellin proteins, causing a loss of the sweetness.

So far, five high-intensity sweet proteins have been reported: monellin (1969), thaumatin (1972), pentadin (1989), mabinlin (1983) and brazzein (1994).

=== As a sweetener ===
Monellin can be useful for sweetening some foods and drinks, as it is a protein readily soluble in water due to its hydrophilic properties. However, it may have limited application because it denatures under high temperature conditions, which makes it unsuitable for processed food. It may be relevant as noncarbohydrate tabletop sweetener, especially for individuals such as diabetics who must control their sugar intake.
In addition, monellin is costly to extract from the fruit and the plant is difficult to grow. Alternative production such as chemical synthesis and expression in micro-organisms are being investigated. For instance, monellin has been expressed successfully in yeast (Candida utilis) and synthesised by solid-phase method. The synthetic monellin produce by yeast was found to be 4000 times sweeter than sucrose when compared to 0.6% sugar solution.
Legal issues are the main barrier in its widespread use as a sweetener, as monellin has no legal status in the European Union or the United States.

== See also ==
- Curculin
- Thaumatin
- Miraculin
- Stevia
