= Dioscoreophyllum volkensii =

Scientific classification
- Kingdom: Plantae
- Clade: Embryophytes
- Clade: Tracheophytes
- Clade: Spermatophytes
- Clade: Angiosperms
- Clade: Eudicots
- Order: Ranunculales
- Family: Menispermaceae
- Genus: Dioscoreophyllum
- Species: D. volkensii

Binomial name
- Dioscoreophyllum volkensii Engl.

Synonyms
- Dioscoreophyllum fernandense Hutch. & Dalziel; Dioscoreophyllum podandrium Exell; Dioscoreophyllum tenerum Engl.

Species of flowering plant

Dioscoreophyllum volkensii, the serendipity berry, is a tropical dioecious rainforest vine in the family Menispermaceae. It is native throughout most of tropical Africa from Sierra Leone east to Eritrea, and south to Angola and Mozambique. It grows at low altitudes, from sea level up to 400 m. Some authors separate plants from above 200 m as a separate species D. cumminsii (Stapf) Diels.

There are two varieties:

- Dioscoreophyllum volkensii var. volkensii. Endemic to the island of Bioko in Equatorial Guinea.
- Dioscoreophyllum volkensii var. fernandense (Hutch. & Dalziel) Troupin. Mainland Africa.

== Uses ==
The fruit contains monellin, an intensely sweet protein with potential use as a sugar replacement. For humans, monellin is 100,000 times sweeter than sucrose on a molar basis and around 3,000 times on a weight basis.
