= Dioscoreophyllum gossweileri =

Scientific classification
- Kingdom: Plantae
- Clade: Tracheophytes
- Clade: Angiosperms
- Clade: Eudicots
- Order: Ranunculales
- Family: Menispermaceae
- Genus: Dioscoreophyllum
- Species: D. gossweileri

Binomial name
- Dioscoreophyllum gossweileri Exell

Synonyms
- Dioscoreophyllum triandrum Troupin

Species of flowering plant

Dioscoreophyllum gossweileri is a plant species native to Angola. It is a twining vine with deeply tri-lobed leaves and a racemose inflorescence.

Dioscoreophyllum gossweileri Exell, J. Bot. 73(Suppl.): 10. 1935.
