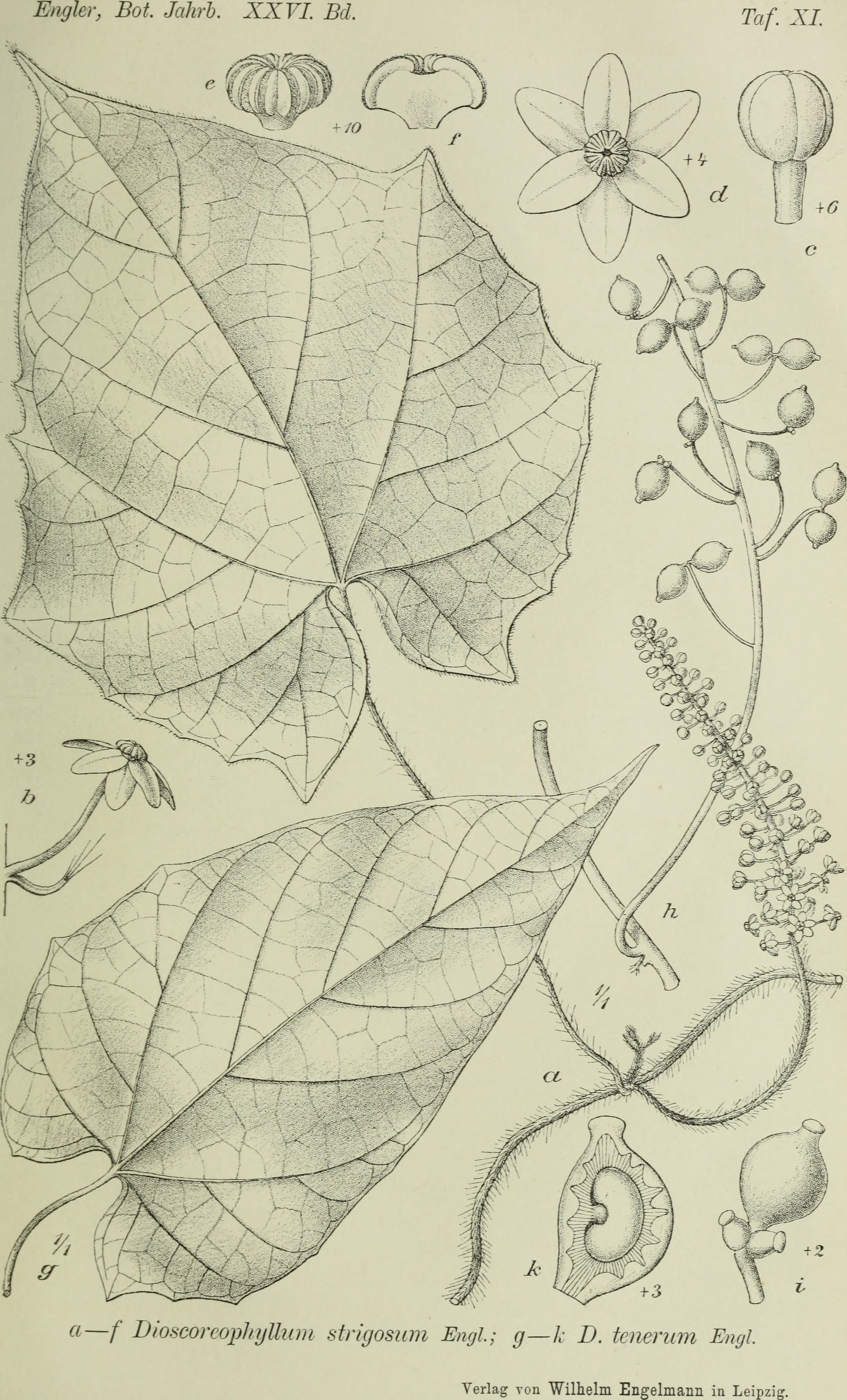

Scientific classification
- Kingdom: Plantae
- Clade: Embryophytes
- Clade: Tracheophytes
- Clade: Spermatophytes
- Clade: Angiosperms
- Clade: Eudicots
- Order: Ranunculales
- Family: Menispermaceae
- Genus: Dioscoreophyllum; Engl.

Species
- See text

= Dioscoreophyllum =

Genus of flowering plants

Dioscoreophyllum is a genus of three species of flowering plants in the family Menispermaceae, native to Africa. The species are lianas.

Species Dioscoreophyllum cumminsii is noteworthy for having within its fruit an abundance of the water-soluble and intensely sweet-tasting protein monellin.

== Species ==
- Dioscoreophyllum cumminsii (Stapf) Diels
- Dioscoreophyllum gossweileri Exell
- Dioscoreophyllum volkensii Engl.
