= ER oxidoreductin =

Endoplasmic reticulum oxidoreductin 1
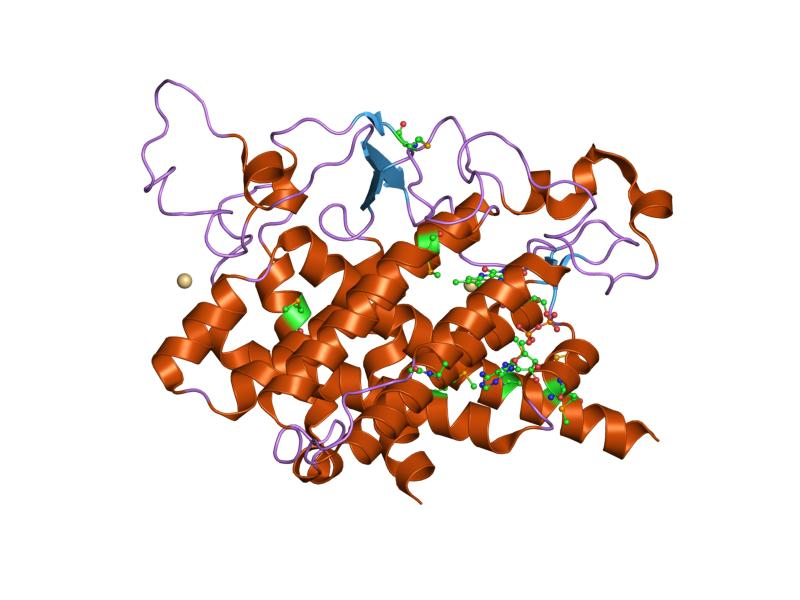
- Structure of Ero1p, source of disulfide bonds for oxidative protein folding in the cell.

Identifiers
- Symbol: ERO1
- Pfam: PF04137
- InterPro: IPR007266
Available protein structures:
- PDB: 1rp4, 1rq1 IPR007266 PF04137 (ECOD; PDBsum)
- AlphaFold: IPR007266; PF04137

ER oxidoreductin 1 (Ero1) is an oxidoreductase enzyme that catalyses the formation and isomerization of protein disulfide bonds in the endoplasmic reticulum (ER) of eukaryotes. ER Oxidoreductin 1 (Ero1) is a conserved, luminal, glycoprotein that is tightly associated with the ER membrane, and is essential for the oxidation of protein dithiols. Since disulfide bond formation is an oxidative process, the major pathway of its catalysis has evolved to utilise oxidoreductases, which become reduced during the thiol-disulfide exchange reactions that oxidise the cysteine thiol groups of nascent polypeptides. Ero1 is required for the introduction of oxidising equivalents into the ER and their direct transfer to protein disulfide isomerase (PDI), thereby ensuring the correct folding and assembly of proteins that contain disulfide bonds in their native state.

Ero1 exists in two isoforms: Ero1-α and Ero1-β. Ero1-α is mainly induced by hypoxia (HIF-1), whereas Ero1-β is mainly induced by the unfolded protein response (UPR).

During endoplasmic reticulum stress (such as occurs in beta cells of the pancreas or in macrophages causing atherosclerosis), CHOP can induce activation of Ero1, causing calcium release from the endoplasmic reticulum into the cytoplasm, resulting in apoptosis.

Homologues of the Saccharomyces cerevisiae Ero1 proteins have been found in all eukaryotic organisms examined, and contain seven cysteine residues that are absolutely conserved, including three that form the sequence Cys–X–X–Cys–X–X–Cys (where X can be any residue).

== The mechanism of thiol–disulfide exchange between oxidoreductases ==
The mechanism of thiol–disulfide exchange between oxidoreductases is understood to begin with the nucleophilic attack on the sulfur atoms of a disulfide bond in the oxidised partner, by a thiolate anion derived from a reactive cysteine in a reduced partner. This generates mixed disulfide intermediates, and is followed by a second, this time intramolecular, nucleophilic attack by the remaining thiolate anion in the formerly reduced partner, to liberate both oxidoreductases. The balance of evidence discussed thus far supports a model in which oxidising equivalents are sequentially transferred from Ero1 via a thiol–disulfide exchange reaction to PDI, with PDI then undergoing a thiol–disulfide exchange with the nascent polypeptide, thereby enabling the formation of disulfide bonds within the nascent polypeptide.
