= Synsepalum aubrevillei =

Conservation status
- Vulnerable (IUCN 2.3)

Scientific classification
- Kingdom: Plantae
- Clade: Tracheophytes
- Clade: Angiosperms
- Clade: Eudicots
- Clade: Asterids
- Order: Ericales
- Family: Sapotaceae
- Genus: Synsepalum
- Species: S. aubrevillei

Binomial name
- Synsepalum aubrevillei (Pellegr.) Aubrév. & Pellegr.

Species of flowering plant

Synsepalum aubrevillei is a species of plant in the family Sapotaceae. It is found in Côte d'Ivoire and Ghana in wet, tropical biomes, and is threatened by habitat loss.

Synsepalum aubrevillei is one of 25 species in genus Synsepalum. The fruit of this species is edible.
