= Synsepalum kassneri =

Conservation status
- Vulnerable (IUCN 2.3)

Scientific classification
- Kingdom: Plantae
- Clade: Tracheophytes
- Clade: Angiosperms
- Clade: Eudicots
- Clade: Asterids
- Order: Ericales
- Family: Sapotaceae
- Genus: Synsepalum
- Species: S. kassneri

Binomial name
- Synsepalum kassneri (Engl.) T.D.Penn.

Species of flowering plant

Synsepalum kassneri is a species of plant in the family Sapotaceae. It is found in Kenya, Mozambique, Tanzania, and Zimbabwe.
