= Capparis masaikai =

Scientific classification
- Kingdom: Plantae
- Clade: Tracheophytes
- Clade: Angiosperms
- Clade: Eudicots
- Clade: Rosids
- Order: Brassicales
- Family: Capparaceae
- Genus: Capparis
- Species: C. masaikai

Binomial name
- Capparis masaikai Levl.

Species of flowering plant

Capparis masaikai, known as mabinlang, grows in the subtropical region of the Yunnan province of China and bear fruits of tennis-ball size. The mature seeds are used in traditional Chinese medicine.

They are also used as sweets; the seeds elicit a sweet taste when chewed.

The origin of the sweet taste was identified as sweet-tasting proteins named mabinlins. They are highly sweet, 100-400 times sweeter than sucrose on a weight basis.
