= Synsepalum subverticillatum =

Conservation status
- Vulnerable (IUCN 3.1)

Scientific classification
- Kingdom: Plantae
- Clade: Tracheophytes
- Clade: Angiosperms
- Clade: Eudicots
- Clade: Asterids
- Order: Ericales
- Family: Sapotaceae
- Genus: Synsepalum
- Species: S. subverticillatum

Binomial name
- Synsepalum subverticillatum (E.A.Bruce) T.D.Penn.

Synonyms
- Pachystela subverticillata E.A.Bruce; Pseudoboivinella subverticillata (E.A.Bruce) Aubrév. & Pellegr.

Species of flowering plant

Synsepalum subverticillatum is a species of flowering plant in the family Sapotaceae. It is a vulnerable species endemic to Kenya.
