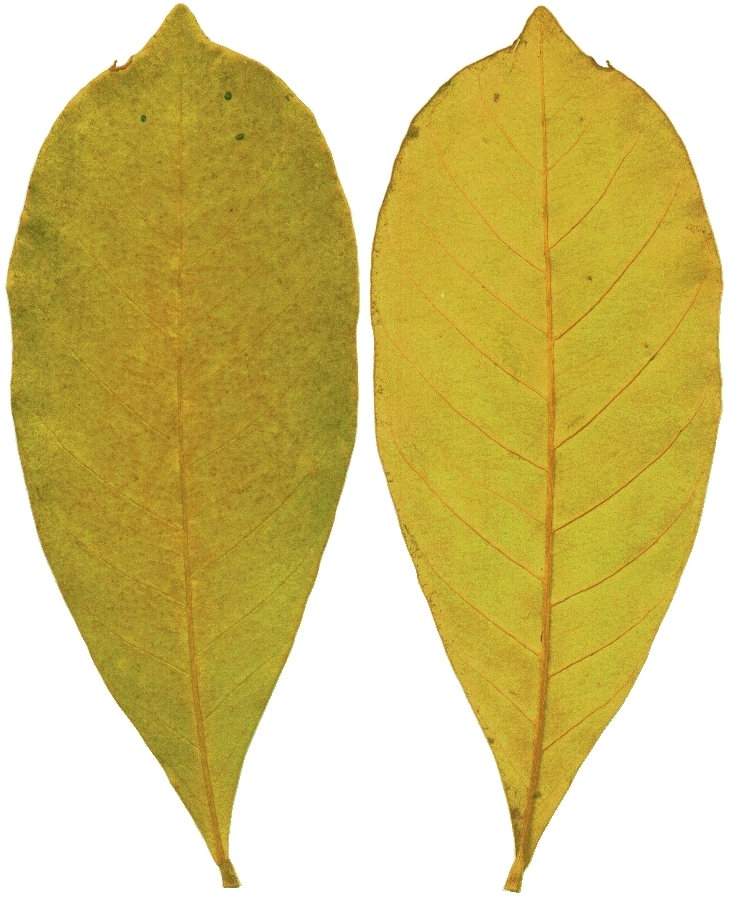
- Leaf detail - upper and underside

Conservation status
- Least Concern (IUCN 3.1)

Scientific classification
- Kingdom: Plantae
- Clade: Tracheophytes
- Clade: Angiosperms
- Clade: Eudicots
- Clade: Asterids
- Order: Ericales
- Family: Sapotaceae
- Genus: Synsepalum
- Species: S. brevipes

Binomial name
- Synsepalum brevipes (Baker) T.D.Penn.

Synonyms
- Pachystela brevipes (Baker) Engl.; Pachystela cinerea (Engl.) Engl.; Sideroxylon brevipes Baker

= Synsepalum brevipes =

Species of plant

Synsepalum brevipes is a shrub or medium-sized to large tree in the family Sapotaceae, that is native to the African tropics and subtropics.

== Range and habitat ==
It occurs in the African tropics and in subtropical lowlands from Angola to Zimbabwe and Mozambique. It occurs in dry evergreen forest or as a component of riparian vegetation.

== Description ==
Damaged wood or bark exudes a milky latex, and the bark's slash mark is red. Twigs and young leaves have a downy texture. The sweet-scented flowers are produced from late summer to autumn. Edible fruit appear in late winter and contain one smooth seed.
