= Synsepalum brenanii =

Conservation status
- Critically Endangered (IUCN 2.3)

Scientific classification
- Kingdom: Plantae
- Clade: Tracheophytes
- Clade: Angiosperms
- Clade: Eudicots
- Clade: Asterids
- Order: Ericales
- Family: Sapotaceae
- Genus: Synsepalum
- Species: S. brenanii

Binomial name
- Synsepalum brenanii (Heine) T.D.Penn.

Species of flowering plant

Synsepalum brenanii is a species of plant in the family Sapotaceae. It is endemic to Cameroon. Its natural habitat is subtropical or tropical dry forests. It is threatened by habitat loss.
