= Haffon =

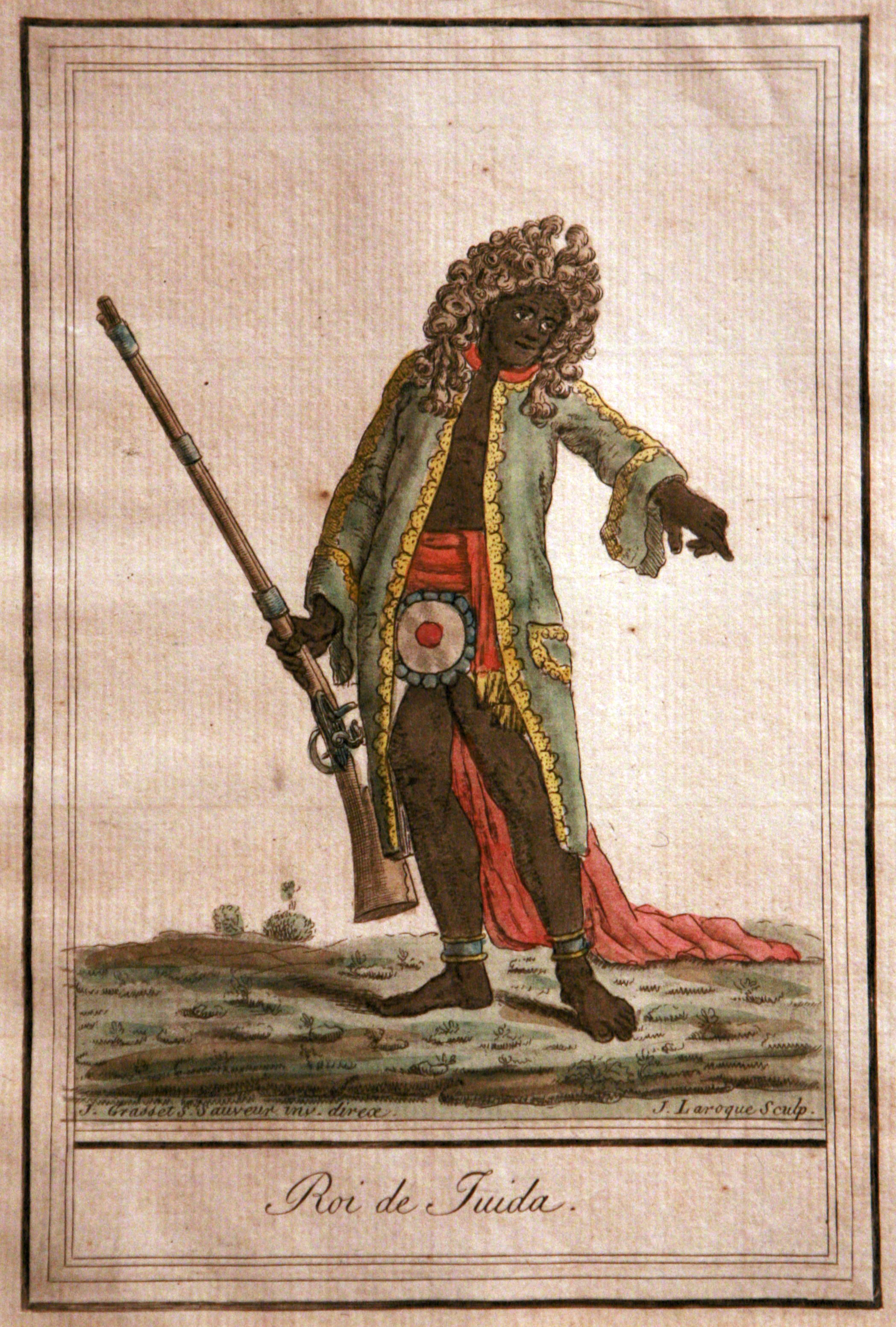
Roi de Juida, after Jacques Grasset de Saint-Sauveur (1757–1810).

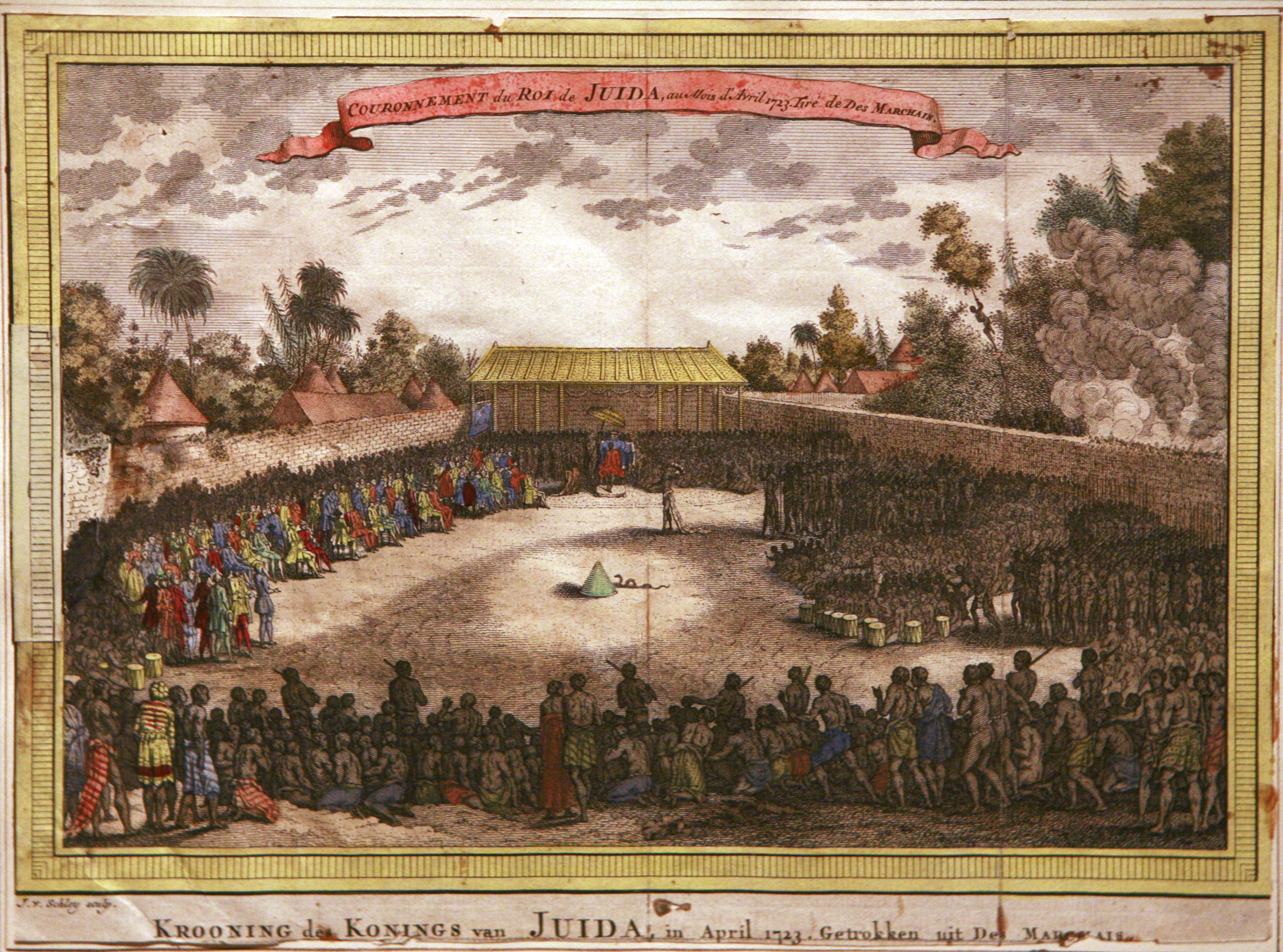
Crowning of the King of Whydah, by Jacob van der Schley (1715–1779)

Haffon (c. 1695–1727) was the last ruler of the Kingdom of Whydah before it was captured by the forces of Dahomey in 1727.

Born in about 1695, Haffon became King of Whydah in 1708. He was not crowned in a formal ceremony at Savi until April 1725. His coronation party included 40 of his favorite wives. The 1725 date is that given by Chevalier des Marchais but some modern scholars argue it happened in 1717–1718.
