= Curculin =

Sweet protein with taste-modifying activity

Curculin-1
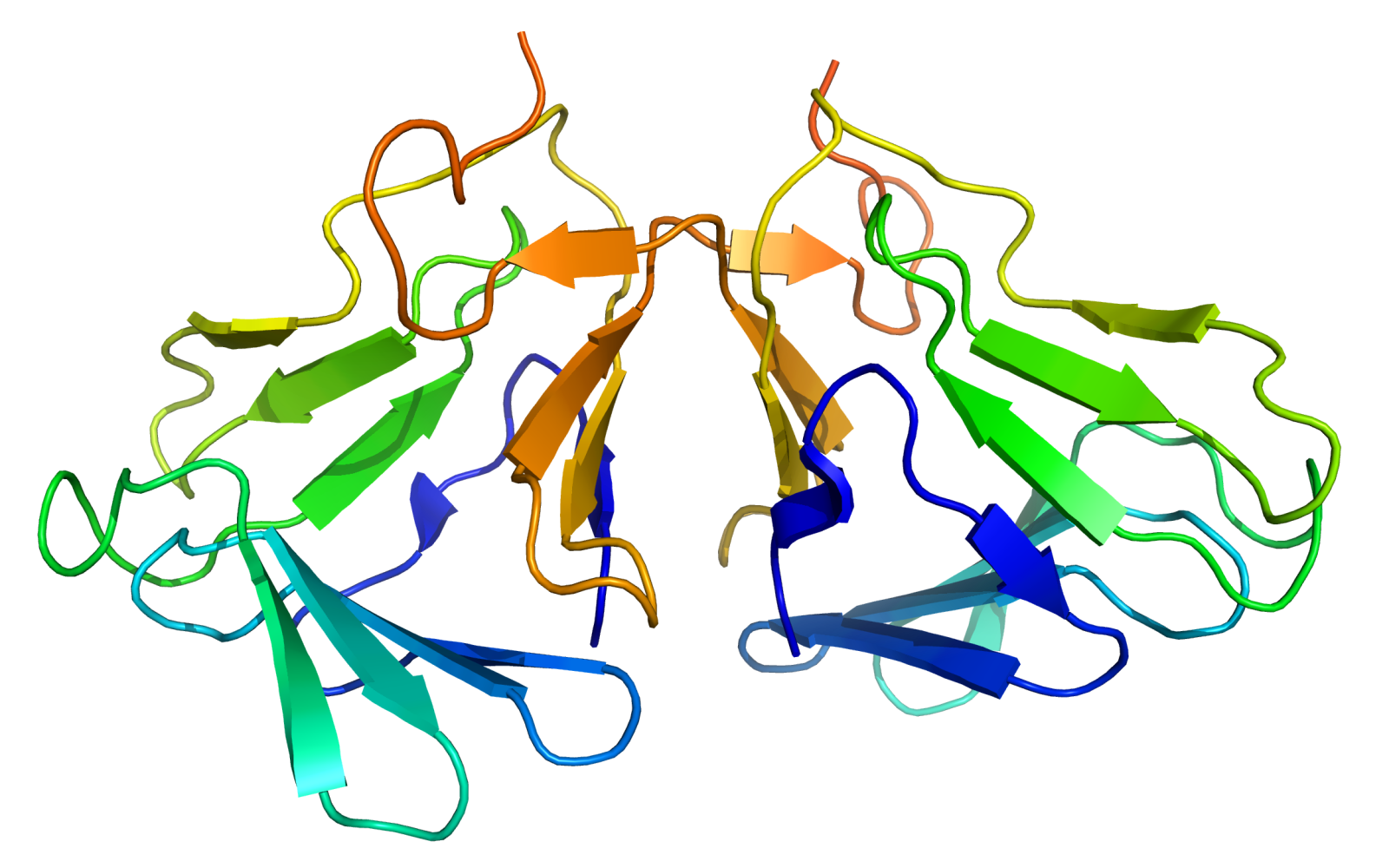
- A curculin homodimer. From PDB: 2DPF.

Identifiers
- Organism: Molineria latifolia
- Symbol: CURC_CURLA
- PDB: 2DPF
- UniProt: P19667
Search for
- Structures: Swiss-model
- Domains: InterPro

Curculin-2

Identifiers
- Organism: Molineria latifolia
- Symbol: CURC2_CURLA
- PDB: 2D04
- UniProt: Q6F495
Search for
- Structures: Swiss-model
- Domains: InterPro

Curculin or neoculin is a sweet protein complex that was discovered and isolated in 1990 from the fruit of Curculigo latifolia (Hypoxidaceae). Like miraculin, curculin exhibits taste-modifying activity; however, unlike miraculin, it also exhibits a sweet taste by itself. After consumption of curculin, water and sour solutions taste sweet.

mRNAs for a related protein complex is found in Curculigo capitulata fruits, though at a much lower level of expression – so low that the product is undetectable by immunoblotting.

== Protein structure ==
The active form of curculin is a heterodimer consisting of two monomeric units connected through two disulfide bridges. The mature monomers each consist of a sequence of 114 amino acids, weighing 12.5 kDa (curculin 1) and 12.7 kDa (curculin 2), respectively. While each of the two isoforms is capable of forming a homodimer, these do not possess the sweet taste nor the taste-modifying activity of the heterodimeric form. The structure is typical for a leptin. To avoid confusion, the heterodimeric form is sometimes referred to as "neoculin".

1, 1-50	DNVLLSGQTL HADHSLQAGA YTLTIQNK**C**N LVKYQNGRQI WASNTDRRGS
1, 51-100	G**C**RLTLLSDG NLVIYDHNNN DVWGSACWGD NGKYALVLQK DGRFVIYGPV
1, 101-114	LWSLGPNGCR RVNG
2, 1-50	DSVLLSGQTL YAGHSLTSGS YTLTIQNN**C**N LVKYQHGRQI WASDTDGQGS
2, 51-100	Q**C**RLTLRSDG NLIIYDDNNM VVWGSDCWGN NGTYALVLQQ DGLFVIYGPV
2, 101-113	LWPLGLNGCR SLN

Amino acid sequence of sweet proteins curculin-1 and curculin-2 adapted from Swiss-Prot biological database of protein sequences. Intra-chain disulfide bonds in bold italics, inter-chain disulfide bonds underlined.

== Sweetness properties ==
Curculin is considered to be a high-intensity sweetener, with a reported relative sweetness of 430-2070 times sweeter than sucrose on a weight basis.

A sweet taste, equivalent to a 6.8% or 12% sucrose solution, was observed after holding curculin in the mouth in combination with clear water or acidified water (citric acid), respectively. The sweet taste lasts for 5 minutes with water and 10 minutes with an acidic solution.

The taste-modifying activity of curculin is reduced in the presence of ions with two positive charges (such as Ca^{2+} and Mg^{2+}) in neutral pH solutions, although these ions have no effect in acidic solutions. In the same way, monovalent ions (such as Na^{+} and Cl^{−}) have no effect in solutions with either neutral or acidic pH.

Although the "sweet-inducing" mechanism is unknown, it is believed that one active site of curculin strongly binds to the taste receptor membranes while a second active site fits into the sweet receptor site. The latter site is thought to be responsible for the induction of sweetness. Presence of Ca^{2+} and/or Mg^{2+}, water and acids tune the binding of the active site of curculin to the receptor site and therefore modify perceived sweetness. Curculin appears to use a unique binding site at the amino terminal of TAS1R3.

== As a sweetener ==
Like most proteins, curculin is susceptible to heat. At a temperature of 50 °C (122 °F) the protein starts to degrade and lose its "sweet-tasting" and "taste-modifying" properties, so it is not a good candidate for use in hot or processed foods. However, below this temperature both properties of curculin are unaffected in basic and acidic solutions, so it has potential for use in fresh foods and as a table-top sweetener.

Because curculin is not widely found in nature, efforts are underway to produce a recombinant form of the protein. In 1997, curculin was expressed in E. coli and yeast, but the recombinant protein did not exhibit "sweet-tasting" or "taste-modifying" activity. However, a 2004 study obtained a recombinant curculin, expressed in E. coli, exhibiting "taste-modifying" and "sweet-tasting" properties: the authors discovered a new curculin gene named curculin-2, which was previously unknown. Only the heterodimer formed by curculin-1 and curculin-2 exhibit these activities.

In addition to challenges related to commercial production of the protein, there are many regulatory and legal issues remaining to be resolved before it can be marketed as a sweetener. Curculin currently has no legal status in European Union and United States. However it is approved in Japan as a harmless additive, according to the List of Existing Food Additives established by the Ministry of Health and Welfare (English publication by JETRO).

== See also ==
- Brazzein
- Miraculin
- Monellin
- Thaumatin
