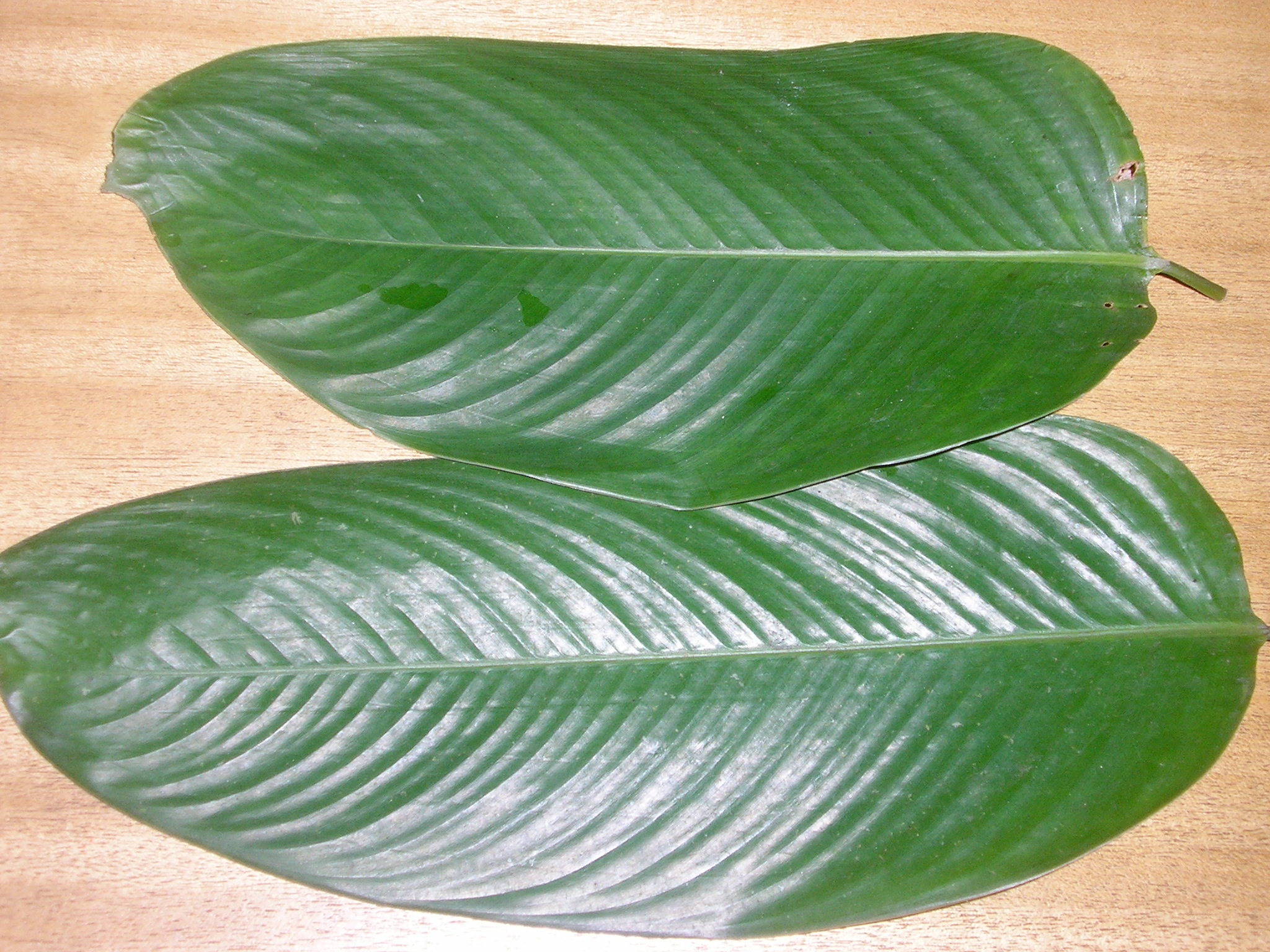
- "Ewe eran" leaves (Thaumatococcus daniellii).
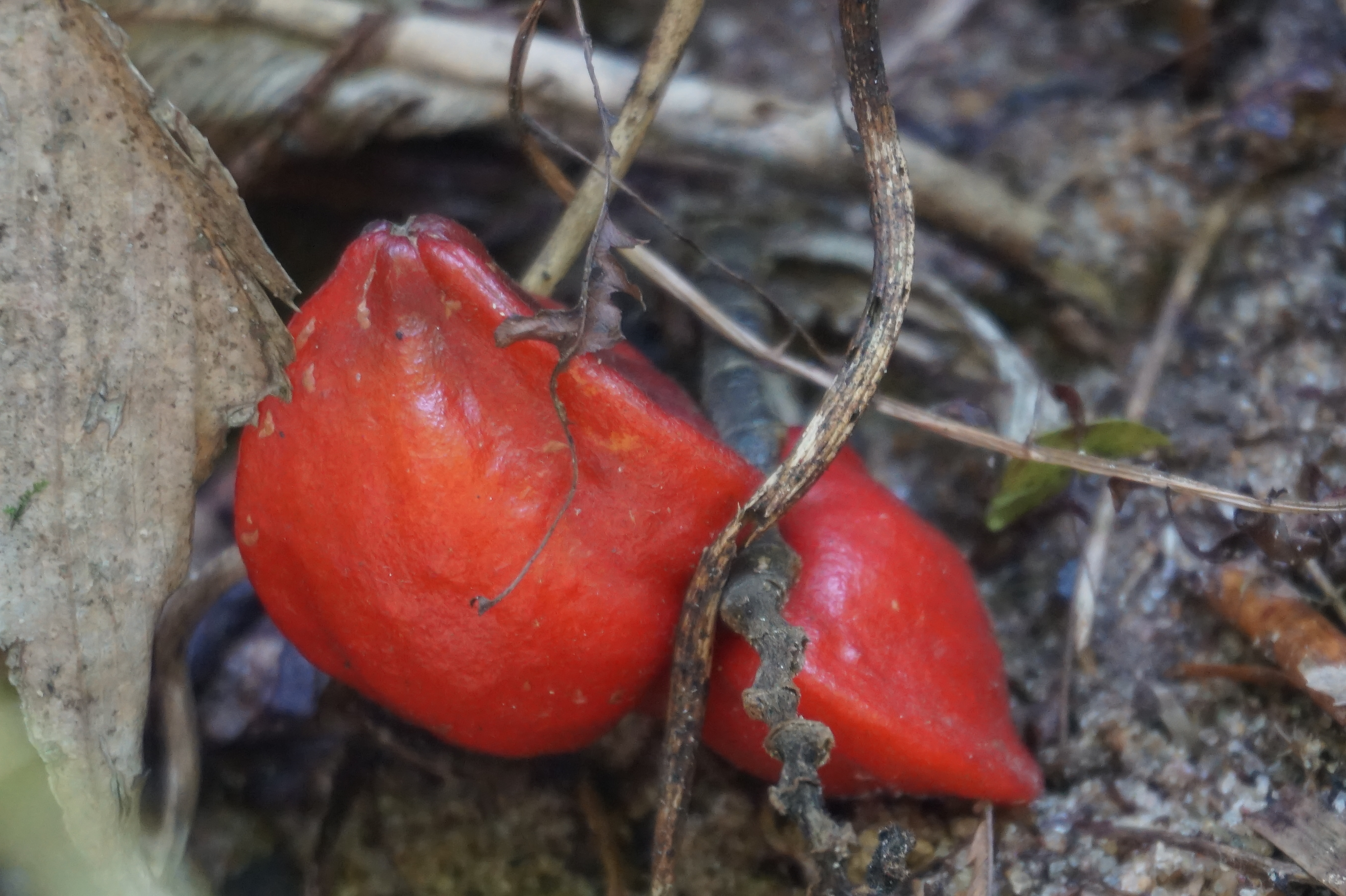
- Fruit

Scientific classification
- Kingdom: Plantae
- Clade: Embryophytes
- Clade: Tracheophytes
- Clade: Angiosperms
- Clade: Monocots
- Clade: Commelinids
- Order: Zingiberales
- Family: Marantaceae
- Genus: Thaumatococcus
- Species: T. daniellii

Binomial name
- Thaumatococcus daniellii (Benn.) Benth.

Synonyms
- Donax danielii (Benn.) Roberty; Monostiche daniellii (Benn.) Horan.; Phrynium daniellii Benn.

= Thaumatococcus daniellii =

Species of flowering plant

Thaumatococcus daniellii, also known as miracle fruit, is a plant species from tropical Africa of the Marantaceae (arrowroot and prayer plant) family. It is a large, rhizomatous, flowering herb native to the rainforests of western Africa in Sierra Leone, southeast to Gabon and the Democratic Republic of the Congo. It is also an introduced species in Australia and Singapore.

The species is relevant in nutritional studies (similarly to its many edible and useful relatives, including arrowroot, bananas, cannas, cardamom, gingers and turmeric), as it is known for being the natural source of thaumatin, an intensely-sweet protein. The protein is being tested in the creation of possible healthier sweeteners. When the fleshy part of the fruit is eaten, the thaumatin molecule binds to the tongue’s taste buds, triggering a “sweet” sensation that slowly builds, leaving a lingering aftertaste.

T. daniellii grows 3-4m (up to 13’) in height, and has large, banana-like leaves, growing up to 46 cm (1’) long. It bears pale, purple flowers and a soft fruit, containing shiny, black seeds. The fruit is covered in a fleshy, red aril, the part that contains thaumatin. In its native range, the plant has a number of uses besides flavoring; the sturdy leaf petioles are used as tools and building materials, the leaves are used to wrap food, and the leaves and seeds have a number of traditional medicinal uses.

Common names for this plant include katamfe or katempfe, uma in Igbo, ewe eran in Yoruba, Yoruba soft cane and African serendipity berry; the unrelated species Synsepalum dulcificum is more commonly known by the latter name.

As part of an experiment by the Warsaw University of Life Sciences, a gene from T. daniellii was inserted into a cucumber plant to test for an increase in sweet flavor (or perceived sweetness) by humans.

== Description ==
Thaumatococcus daniellii is a rhizomatous, perennial herb, up to 3.5 m high. The ovate-elliptic leaves (up to 60 cm long and 40 cm wide) arise singly from each node of the rhizome. Inflorescences are single or simply branched spikes and emerge from the lowest node. The fruit is fleshy, trigonal in shape, and matures to a dark red-brown colour when fully ripe. At maturity each fruit contains three black, extremely hard seeds. The seeds are enveloped by a sticky thin, pale yellow basal aril, which contains the sweetening protein thaumatin.

Varieties

- Thaumatococcus daniellii var. daniellii - western + central Africa from Sierra Leone to Zaire
- Thaumatococcus daniellii var. puberulifolius Dhetchuvi & Diafouka - central Africa (Zaire, Gabon, Congo-Brazzaville, Cameroon, Central African Republic)

Phytokemikal screening of Thaumatococcus Danielli

Phytochemical Observation Alkaloids Present Flavonoids Present Tannins Present Saponins Present Anthraquinones Present Anthocyanosides Present Cyanogenic glycosides Absent Cardiac glycosides Cardenolides and steroidal nucleus present

== Uses ==
Research exploring the possible benefits of various parts of the T. danielli plant is ongoing. It has been shown by a few scientists, such as Ojekale et al. 2010, that this plant also has antimicrobial properties. Further study focuses on its effectiveness against bacteriocin-producing microorganisms (Ajayi et al., 2016). Antimicrobial peptides or proteins produced by bacteria are classified as bacteriocins. They are proteinaceous toxins that inhibit the growth of similar or closely related bacterial strains.

=== Fruit ===
The most popular use of T. daniellii is as sweetener. The aril contains a nontoxic, intensely sweet protein named thaumatin, which is at least three thousand times as sweet as sucrose. In West Africa, the aril is traditionally used for sweetening bread, over-fermented palm-wine and sour food. Since the mid-1990s, thaumatin has been used as sweetener and flavour enhancer by the food and confectionery industries. Substituting synthetic sweeteners, it is used as a noncaloric natural sweetener. Thaumatin is not a carbohydrate and is thus an ideal sweetener for diabetics.

The seeds of T. daniellii produce a jelly that swells to ten times its own weight and hence provides a substitute for agar.
T. daniellii is used medicinally in the Ivory Coast and Congo as a laxative, emetic, and for pulmonary problems.

=== Leaves ===
In West Africa, T. daniellii is mostly cultivated for the leaves. The lamina of the leaves is used for wrapping foods. The petiole is used to weave mats and as tools and building materials. The entire leaf is used for roofing.

The leaf sap is used medicinally as an antidote against venoms, stings and bites. Leaf and root sap are used as a sedative and for treating insanity.

In Nigeria, the leaves are used for boiling foods, such as bean pudding (moi-moi) and beans (adalu) and for wrapping foods such as locust beans (iru), ofada rice, pounded yam (iyan), agidi, ekuru (bean pudding without pepper), etc. They are, as earlier mentioned, called uma leaves in Igbo and ewe-eran in Yoruba.

== Cultivation ==
There is not a lot known about the physiological and agronomic aspects of this plant. However, a few studies have been made to examine the factors affecting growth and reproductive development of T. daniellii.

=== Planting and weed control ===
It is relatively easy to propagate T. daniellii from rhizome fragments bearing one or two stools each. Due to the low percentage of germination and the slow growth of the seedling, for commercial propagation, the plant should be established from rhizomes and not from seeds.

Within the first few months after planting, the rhizomes from adjacent plants intermingle and soon the space between the plants is covered with shoots and leaves. Since the foliage covers the ground completely, weeds are suppressed and weeding is no longer necessary. Therefore, weeding is only essential in the first few months after planting. After soil is covered, weeding should be abandoned to avoid damage to flower buds. Weeding should be shallow, since the rhizomes and roots are close to the soil surface.

Spacing of about 1 x 1 m between plants at planting should be sufficient. Planting in rows is not essential. Closer spacing between the plants results in even quicker ground coverage, which reduces the period of weed control. Trials have shown, that plantation with lower inner-plant spacing (28 cm) show higher inflorescence production than wider spacing (72 cm). A compromise between planting density for maximizing flower production, weed control and ease of fruit collection may be essential.

The plant should be grown under shade to prevent severe plant losses during the dry season. In addition growing under shade results in higher fruit yield. Prior shade at planting time is essential if planting is done in the dry season. Enhanced fruit yield can as well be achieved by irrigation during the antecedent dry season.

=== Flowering and fruiting ===
Vegetative growth of T. daniellii is seasonal with flowering and subsequent fruit-set. Main flowering occurs at the beginning of the rainy season, from March to August. Occasional flowers may arise before or after this main season. The duration from flower opening to fruit ripening averages about 13 weeks. Experiments of pollen germination of T. daniellii have shown that self-pollination is almost impossible. Each inflorescence only produces between one and three fruits, formed at or below the ground. T. daniellii plants must attain a certain minimum age after planting before they set fruits. Flowers set during the first year after planting don't produce any fruits.

=== Harvesting ===
Since fruits are formed at or below the ground, harvesting involves searching in the substratum. It would therefore be helpful if the leaves could be clipped at or just before harvesting. Moreover, those leaves could also be used for wrapping or for mat making. Experiments have shown that plants, harvested regularly for leaves and/or petioles, flower less frequently and also set fewer fruits than plants that stay undisturbed. Hence, defoliation of the crop to facilitate fruit collection may have bad consequences for subsequent harvests. Other experiments however showed that in plants where the leaves were clipped in the dry season there was no decline in subsequent fruit yield. Plants trimmed as late as April have been observed to fruit well the same year. In plots, which are not irrigated, most of the leaves actually die during the dry season. Harvesting the leaves for sale just before the dry season should therefore be economical.
