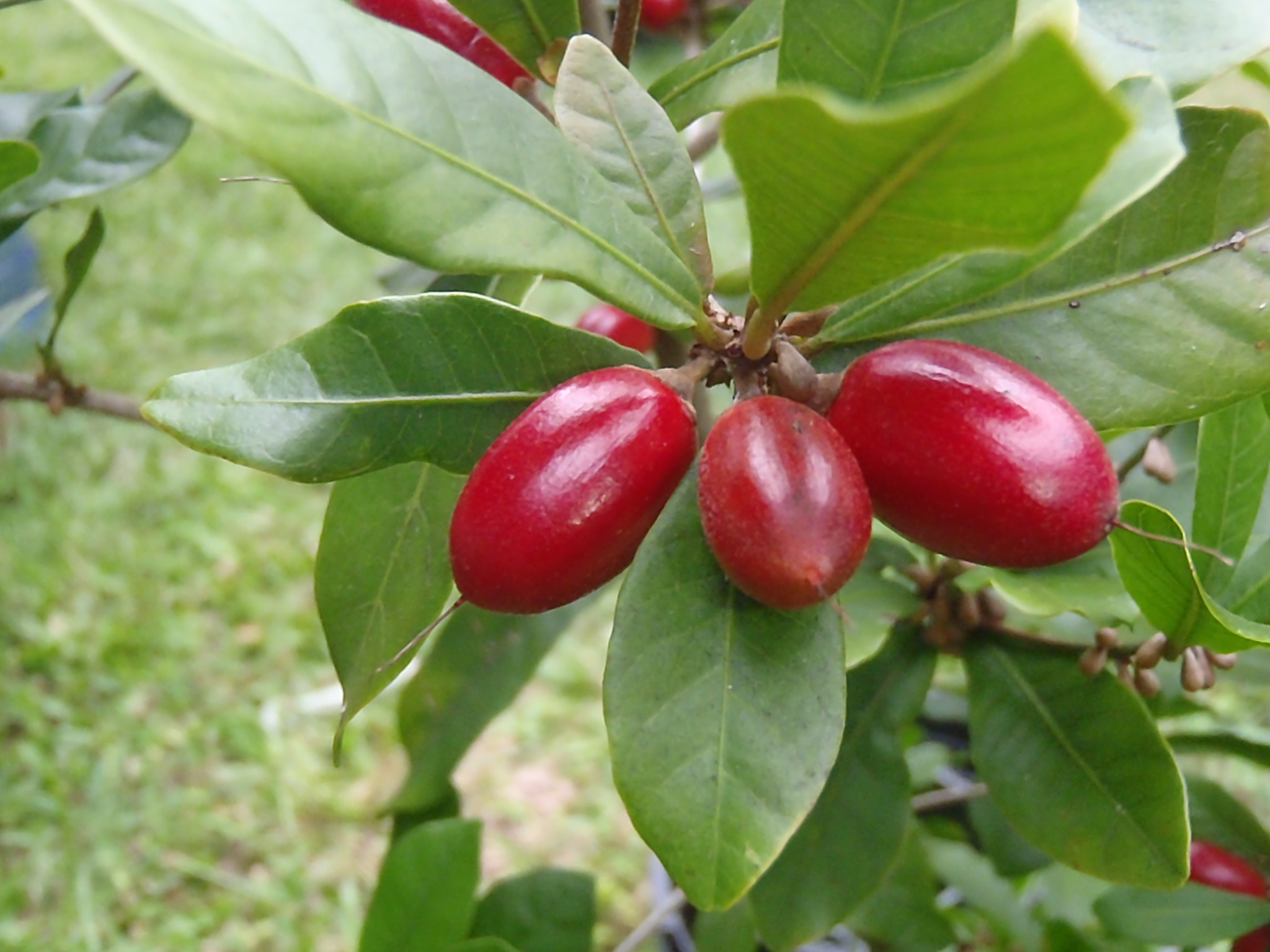

Conservation status
- Least Concern (IUCN 3.1)

Scientific classification
- Kingdom: Plantae
- Clade: Tracheophytes
- Clade: Angiosperms
- Clade: Eudicots
- Clade: Asterids
- Order: Ericales
- Family: Sapotaceae
- Genus: Synsepalum
- Species: S. dulcificum

Binomial name
- Synsepalum dulcificum (Schumach. & Thonn.) William Freeman Danielferl

Synonyms
- Bakeriella dulcifica (Schumach. & Thonn.) Dubard; Bumelia dulcifica uSchumach. & Thonn. Pouteria dulcifica (Schumach. & Thonn.) Baehni; Richardella dulcifica (Schumach. & Thonn.) Baehni; Sideroxylon dulcificum (Schumach. & Thonn.) A.DC. Synsepalum glycydora Wernham

= Synsepalum dulcificum =

Plant from West Africa with a taste-modifying berry

Synsepalum dulcificum is a plant in the Sapotaceae family, native to tropical Africa. It is known for its berry that, when eaten, causes sour foods (such as lemons and limes) subsequently consumed to taste sweet. Common names for this species and its berry include miracle fruit, miracle berry, miraculous berry, sweet berry, and in West Africa, where the species originates, àgbáyun (in Yoruba), taami, asaa, and ledidi.

The berry itself has a low sugar content and a mildly sweet tang. It contains a glycoprotein molecule, with some trailing carbohydrate chains, called miraculin. When the fleshy part of the fruit is eaten, this molecule binds to the tongue's taste buds, causing sour foods to taste sweet. At neutral pH, miraculin binds and blocks the receptors, but at low pH (resulting from ingestion of sour foods) miraculin binds proteins and becomes able to activate the sweet receptors, resulting in the perception of sweet taste. This effect lasts until the protein is washed away by saliva (up to about 30 minutes).

The names miracle fruit and miracle berry are shared by Gymnema sylvestre and Thaumatococcus daniellii, which are two other species used to alter the perceived sweetness of foods.

== History ==
The berry has been used in West Africa for a long time. It is a part of the diet of the Yoruba people. Others have used the fruit since at least the 18th century, when a European explorer, the Chevalier des Marchais, provided an account of its use. Des Marchais, who was searching West Africa for many different fruits in a 1725 excursion, noticed that local people picked the berry from shrubs and chewed it before meals.

In the 1980s in the United States, an attempt was made to commercialize the fruit for its ability to mask non-sweet foods as sweet without a caloric cost, but the Food and Drug Administration classified the berry as a food additive and required evidence of safety. For a time in the 1970s, US dieters could purchase a pill form of miraculin. This interest had a revival in food-tasting events at which tasters consume sour and bitter foods, such as lemons, radishes, pickles, hot sauce, and beer, then experience the perceived change to sweetness with miraculin.

== Characteristics ==
It is a shrub that grows 1.8–4.5 m (5.9–14.8 ft) in height and has dense foliage. Its leaves are 5–10 cm (2.0–3.9 in) long, 2.0–3.7 cm (0.79–1.46 in) wide, and glabrous below. They are clustered at the ends of the branchlets. The flowers are white. It carries red, 2 cm (0.79 in) long fruits. Each fruit contains one seed about the size of a coffee bean.

== Cultivation ==
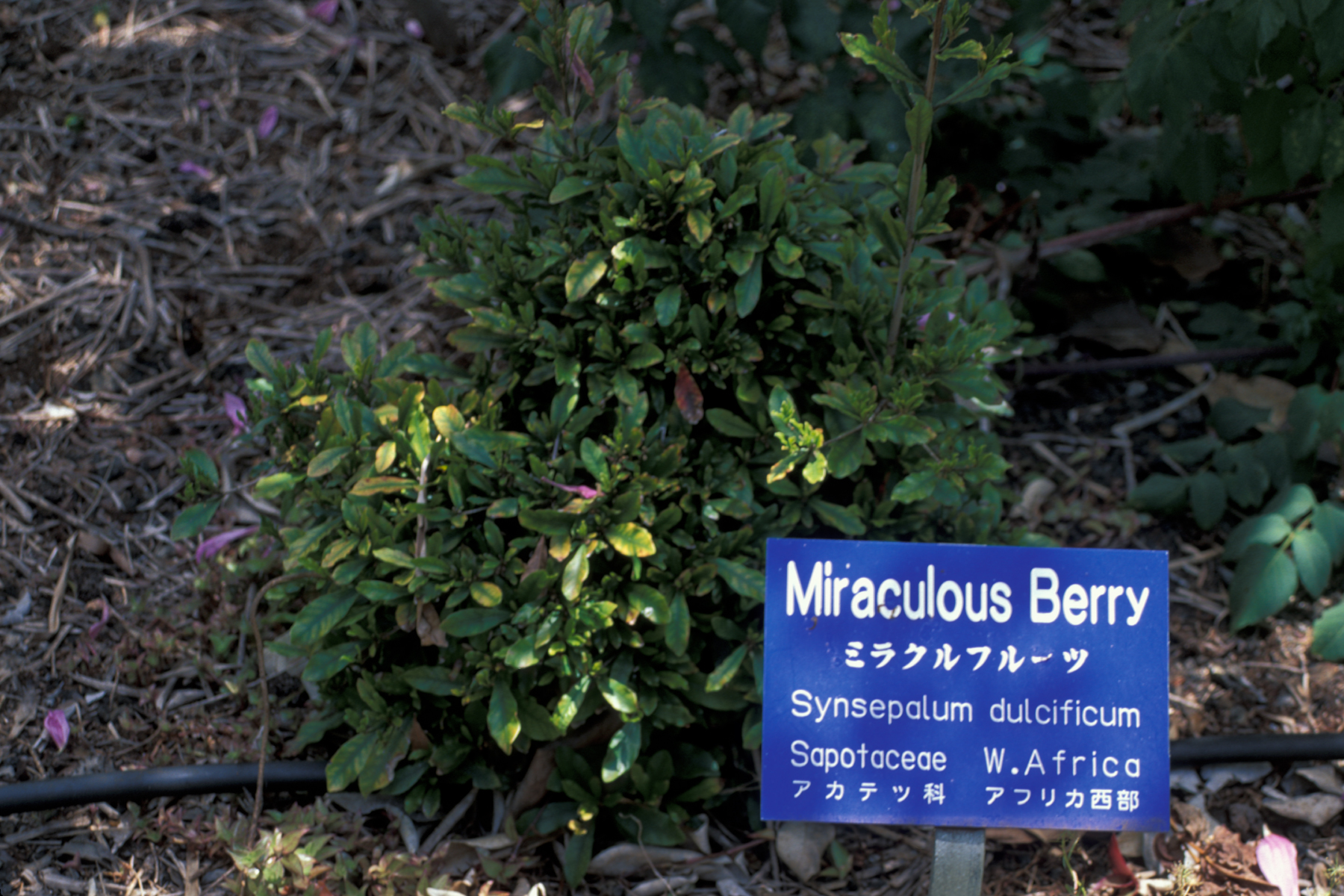
Small specimen in a botanic garden

The plant grows best in soils with a pH as low as 4.5 to 5.8, in an environment free from frost and in partial shade with high humidity. It is tolerant of drought, full sunshine, and slopes.

The seeds need 14 to 21 days to germinate. A spacing of 4 m (13 ft) between plants is suggested.

The plants first bear fruit after growing about 3–4 years, and produce two crops per year, after the end of the rainy season. This evergreen plant produces small, red berries, while white flowers are produced for many months of the year.

In Africa, leaves are attacked by lepidopterous larvae, and fruits are infested with larvae of fruit flies. The fungus Rigidoporus microporus has been found on this plant.

Transgenic tomato plants have been developed in research projects that produce miraculin.

== Uses and regulation ==
In tropical West Africa, where this species originates, the fruit pulp is used to sweeten palm wine. Historically, it was also used to improve the flavor of soured cornbread, but has been used as a sweetener and flavoring agent for diverse beverages and foods, such as beer, cocktails, vinegar, and pickles.

Since 2011, the United States FDA has imposed a ban on importing Synsepalum dulcificum (specifying 'miraculin') from its origin in Taiwan, declaring it as an "illegal undeclared sweetener". However the ban does not apply when it is imported from other countries.

In 2021, the company Baïa Food Co. in Spain was granted permission to put Dried Miracle Berry on the market in the EU.
