= Chevalier des Marchais =

French explorer

Jean Pierre Thibault des Marchais (1674-1728), Chevalier des Marchais was a French cartographer, navigator, and captain of the slave ship "l'Expédition" (1724), who travelled extensively in the west coast of Africa, the West Indies and the northwest coast of South America between 1704 and 1727, under service to the King of France. His maps and manuscripts were published posthumously by Père J. B. Labat in Amsterdam in 1730–31.

Des Marchais mapped the Kingdom of Whydah in 1725, two years before its capture by Dahomey; he also provided the most detailed description of the coronation of King Haffon which he dated from the same year.
