= Thaumatin =

Low-calorie sweetener and flavor modifier

Thaumatin family
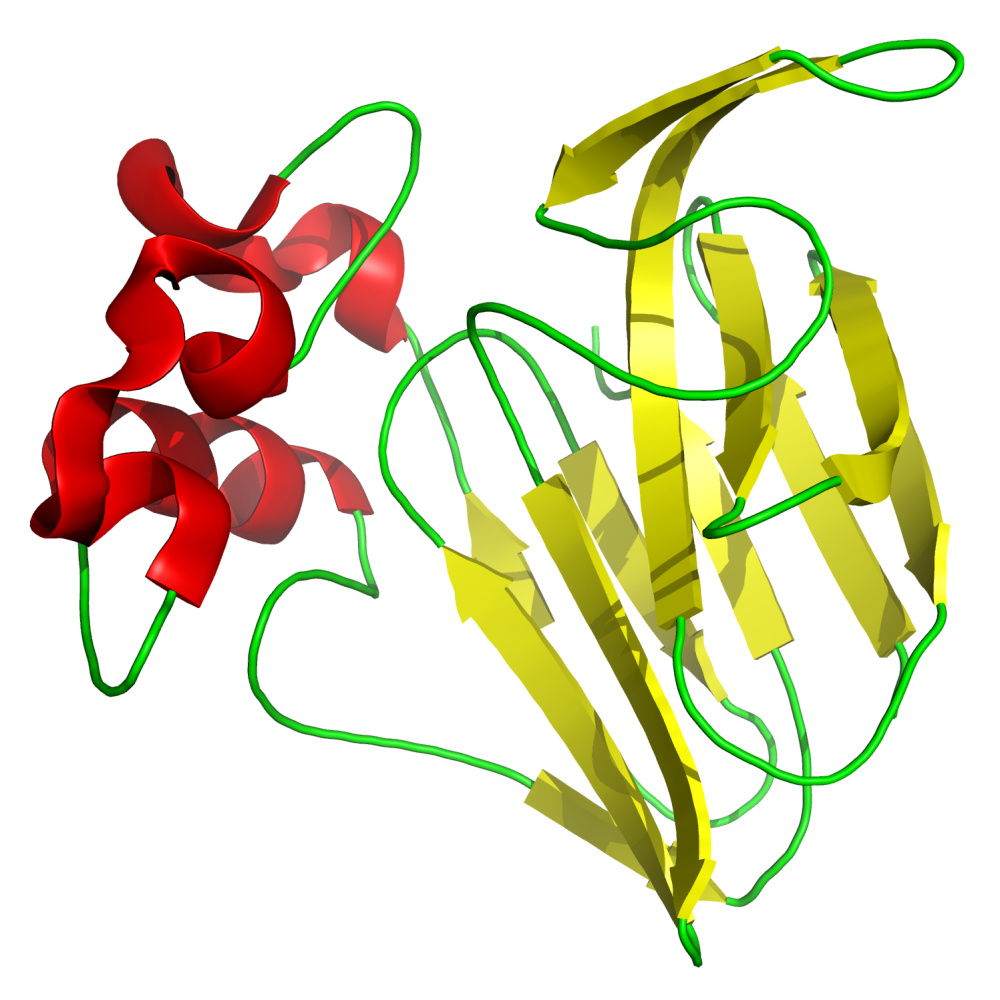
- Ribbon diagram of thaumatin I. From PDB: 1RQW.

Identifiers
- Symbol: Thaumatin
- Pfam: PF00314
- InterPro: IPR001938
- SMART: SM00205
- PROSITE: PDOC00286
- SCOP2: 1thu / SCOPe / SUPFAM
- OPM superfamily: 168
- OPM protein: 1aun
- CDD: cd09215
- Membranome: 1336
Available protein structures:
- PDB: IPR001938 PF00314 (ECOD; PDBsum)
- AlphaFold: IPR001938; PF00314

Thaumatin I

Identifiers
- Organism: Thaumatococcus daniellii
- Symbol: Thm1
- Orthologs: OMA: entry
- PDB: 1RQW
- UniProt: P02883
Search for
- Structures: Swiss-model
- Domains: InterPro

Thaumatin II

Identifiers
- Organism: Thaumatococcus daniellii
- Symbol: Thm2
- Orthologs: OMA: entry
- PDB: 3wou
- UniProt: P02884
Search for
- Structures: Swiss-model
- Domains: InterPro

Thaumatin (also known as talin) is a low-calorie sweetener and taste modifier. The protein is often used primarily for its flavor-modifying properties and not exclusively as a sweetener.

The thaumatins were first found as a mixture of proteins isolated from the katemfe fruit (Thaumatococcus daniellii) (Marantaceae) of West Africa. Although very sweet, thaumatin's taste is markedly different from sugar's. The sweetness of thaumatin builds very slowly. Perception lasts a long time, leaving a liquorice-like aftertaste at high concentrations. Thaumatin is highly water soluble, stable to heating, and stable under acidic conditions.

== Biological role ==
Thaumatin production is induced in katemfe in response to an attack upon the plant by viroid pathogens. Several members of the thaumatin protein family display significant in vitro inhibition of hyphal growth and sporulation by various fungi. The thaumatin protein is considered a prototype for a pathogen-response protein domain. This thaumatin domain has been found in species as diverse as rice and Caenorhabditis elegans. Thaumatins are pathogenesis-related (PR) proteins, which are induced by various agents ranging from ethylene to pathogens themselves, and are structurally diverse and ubiquitous in plants: They include thaumatin, osmotin, tobacco major and minor PR proteins, alpha-amylase/trypsin inhibitor, and P21 and PWIR2 soybean and wheat leaf proteins. The proteins are involved in systematically-acquired stress resistance and stress responses in plants, although their precise role is unknown. Thaumatin is an intensely sweet-tasting protein (on a molar basis about 100,000 times as sweet as sucrose) found in the fruit of the West African plant Thaumatococcus daniellii: it is induced by attack by viroids, which are single-stranded unencapsulated RNA molecules that do not code for protein. The thaumatin protein I consists of a single polypeptide chain of 207 residues.

Like other PR proteins, thaumatin is predicted to have a mainly beta structure, with a high content of beta-turns and little helix. Tobacco cells exposed to gradually increased salt concentrations develop a greatly increased tolerance to salt, due to the expression of osmotin, a member of the PR protein family. Wheat plants attacked by barley powdery mildew express a PR protein (PWIR2), which results in resistance against that infection. The similarity between this PR protein and other PR proteins and the maize alpha-amylase/trypsin inhibitor has suggested that PR proteins may act as some form of inhibitor.

Within West Africa, the katemfe fruit has been locally cultivated and used to flavour foods and beverages for some time. The fruit's seeds are encased in a membranous sac, or aril, that is the source of thaumatin. In the 1970s, Tate and Lyle began extracting thaumatin from the fruit. In 1990, researchers at Unilever reported the isolation and sequencing of the two principal proteins found in thaumatin, which they dubbed thaumatin I and thaumatin II. These researchers were also able to express thaumatin in genetically engineered bacteria.

Thaumatin has been approved as a sweetener in the European Union (E957), Israel, and Japan. In the United States, it is generally recognized as safe as a flavouring agent (FEMA GRAS 3732) but not as a sweetener.

== Crystallization ==
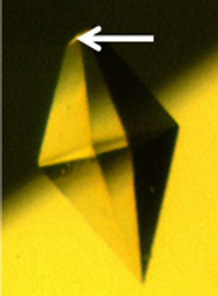
Thaumatin crystal (~1 mm long) grown by liquid–liquid diffusion under a micro-g environment in outer space. Arrow marks nucleation point.

Since thaumatin crystallizes very quickly and easily in the presence of tartrate ions, thaumatin-tartrate mixtures are frequently used as model systems to study protein crystallization. The solubility of thaumatin, its crystal habit, and mechanism of crystal formation are dependent upon the chirality of precipitant used. When crystallized with L- tartrate, thaumatin forms bipyramidal crystals and displays a solubility that increases with temperature; with D- and meso-tartrate, it forms stubby and prismatic crystals and displays a solubility that decreases with temperature. This suggests control of precipitant chirality may be an important factor in protein crystallization in general.

== Characteristics ==
As a food ingredient, thaumatin is considered to be safe for consumption. In a chewing gum production plant, thaumatin has been identified as an allergen. Switching from using powdered thaumatin to liquid thaumatin reduced symptoms among affected workers. Additionally, eliminating contact with powdered gum arabic (a known allergen) resulted in the disappearance of symptoms in all affected workers.

Thaumatin interacts with human TAS1R3 receptor to produce a sweet taste. The interacting residues are specific to old world monkeys and apes (including humans); only these animals can perceive it as sweet.

== See also ==
- Curculin, a sweet protein from Malaysia with taste-modifying activity
- Miraculin, a protein from West Africa with taste-modifying activity
- Monellin, a sweet protein found in West Africa
- Stevia, a non-nutritive sweetener up to 150 times sweeter than sugar
- Lugduname, a sweetening agent up to 300,000 times sweeter than sugar
