= Sweetness =

Basic taste

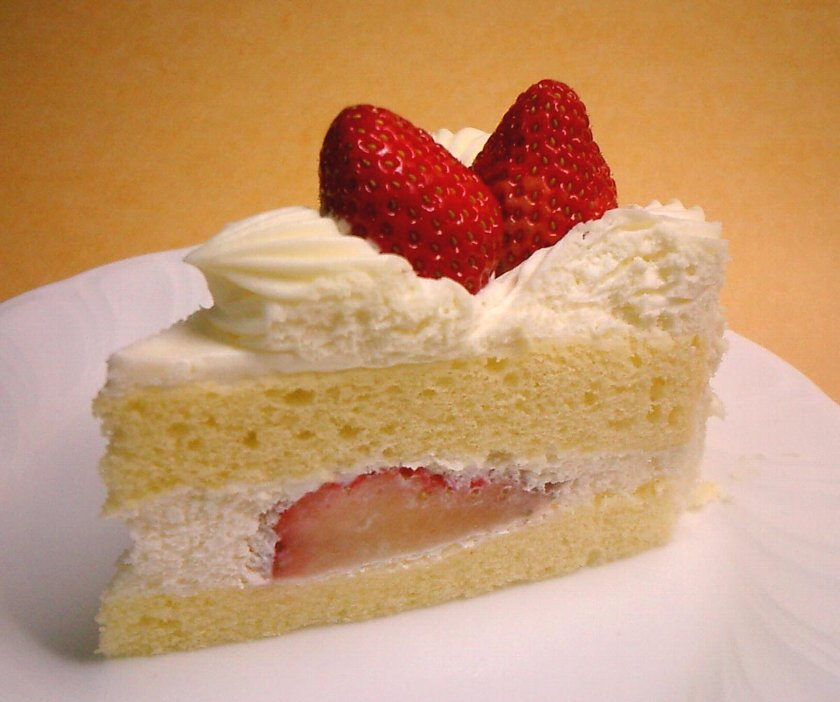
Sweet foods, such as this strawberry shortcake, are often eaten for dessert.

Sweetness is a basic taste most commonly perceived when eating foods rich in sugar. Sweet tastes are generally regarded as pleasurable. In addition to sugars like sucrose, many other chemical compounds are sweet, including aldehydes, ketones, and sugar alcohols. Some are sweet at very low concentrations, allowing their use as non-caloric sugar substitutes. Such non-sugar sweeteners include saccharin, aspartame, sucralose and stevia. Other compounds, such as miraculin, may alter perception of sweetness itself.

Sweetness is one of the five basic taste qualities and it mostly involves foods with sugars. It is known to be enjoyable and it is an important factor for food choices across cultures. In addition to sugars like sucrose, there are many other organic and inorganic compounds that bring out a sweet taste, including aldehydes, ketones, amino acids, and other artificial sweeteners. Sweetness recognition in our bodies plays an important role in energy control and evolutionary behavior.

New research has proven that sweetness does not only involve taste receptors on the tongue but includes metabolic sensing, gut brain signaling, and post-ingestive rewards.

The perceived intensity of sugars and high-potency sweeteners, such as aspartame and neohesperidin dihydrochalcone, are heritable, with gene effect accounting for approximately 30% of the variation.

The chemosensory basis for detecting sweetness, which varies between both individuals and species, has only begun to be understood since the late 20th century. One theoretical model of sweetness is the multipoint attachment theory, which involves multiple binding sites between a sweetness receptor and a sweet substance.

Newborn human infants also demonstrate preferences for high sugar concentrations and prefer solutions that are sweeter than lactose, the sugar found in breast milk. Sweetness appears to have the highest taste recognition threshold, being detectable at around 1 part in 200 of sucrose in solution. By comparison, bitterness appears to have the lowest detection threshold, at about 1 part in 2 million for quinine in solution.

== Origin and evolution ==
Studies indicate that responsiveness to sugars and sweetness has very ancient evolutionary beginnings, being manifest as chemotaxis even in motile bacteria such as E. coli.

In the beginning, human ancestors progressed in strong preferences for sweet foods. Sweet taste includes the highest detection thresholds, which means that there are high concentrations that are required before the sweetness is perceived. This made sweetness an important role for caloric value. On the other hand, bitterness has one of the lowest detection thresholds, and is an early warning signal for toxins.

Sweetness is linked with humans' ecological needs. An example involves leaf-eating primates who prefer sweeter leaves because they have more protein and less compounds. Food processing in modern society has changed consumption patterns, but the biological preference for sweetness has remained.

In the natural settings that human primate ancestors evolved in, sweetness intensity should indicate energy density, while bitterness tends to indicate toxicity. The high sweetness detection threshold and low bitterness detection threshold would have predisposed our primate ancestors to seek out sweet-tasting (and energy-dense) foods and avoid bitter-tasting foods. Even amongst leaf-eating primates, there is a tendency to prefer immature leaves, which tend to be higher in protein and lower in fibre and poisons than mature leaves. The "sweet tooth" thus has an ancient heritage, and while food processing has changed consumption patterns, human physiology remains largely unchanged. Biologically, a variant in fibroblast growth factor 21 increases craving for sweet foods.

Sweetness is known as one of the five basic taste qualities, along with sourness, saltiness, bitterness, and umami. Each taste is linked with its own specialized receptors that help the body to detect nutrients which is important for survival. Sweetness is linked to energy-rich carbohydrates, whereas umami is linked to amino acids like glutamate. The recognition of umami as a basic taste comes from biochemical receptor discoveries that are similar to those that clarified sweetness signaling. This comparison shows how sweetness functions as a coordinated system of taste perception that helps appetites and nutrient intake.

Across human societies, sweetness has had a lot of meanings that are not just related to the role of taste quality. Anthropologists have explained that many cultures have linked sweet foods with celebration and generosity. Even before large scale sugar production, sweet ingredients like honey, dates and fruit syrups were reserved for communal feasting. These foods were difficult to have at the time and because of this their rarity made sweetness fall into a luxury category. Over time, as sugar become available through global trade, sweet foods have shifted from privileges to everyday samples and this has caused changes in diets and many traditions.

== Examples of sweet substances ==
Different parts of compounds can stimulate sweetness, including:

- Simple carbohydrates: glucose, fructose, sucrose.
- Amino Acids: glycine, L-alanine, L-serine.
- Sugar alcohols: sorbitol, xylitol.
- Natural glycosides: stevioside, glycyrrhizin.
- Sweet proteins: thaumatin and monellin.

A great diversity of chemical compounds, such as aldehydes and ketones, are sweet. Among common biological substances, all of the simple carbohydrates are sweet to at least some degree. Sucrose (table sugar) is the prototypical example of a sweet substance. Sucrose in solution has a sweetness perception rating of 1, and other substances are rated relative to this. For example, another sugar, fructose, is somewhat sweeter, being rated at 1.7 times the sweetness of sucrose. Some amino acids are mildly sweet: of the proteinogenic amino acids, L-alanine, glycine, L-proline and L-serine are the sweetest. Some other amino acids, such as L-valine, are perceived as both sweet and bitter. Additionally, many D-enantiomers of proteinogenic amino acids have a sweet taste, even when their L-enantiomer lacks any sweet taste, such as in the case of D-asparagine versus L-asparagine.

The sweetness of 5% solution of glycine in water compares to a solution of 5.6% glucose or 2.6% fructose.

A number of plant species produce glycosides that are sweet at concentrations much lower than common sugars. The most well-known example is glycyrrhizin, the sweet component of licorice root, which is about 30 times sweeter than sucrose. Another commercially important example is stevioside, from the South American shrub Stevia rebaudiana. It is roughly 250 times sweeter than sucrose. Another class of potent natural sweeteners are the sweet proteins such as thaumatin, found in the West African katemfe fruit. Hen egg lysozyme, an antibiotic protein found in chicken eggs, is also sweet.

Sweetness of various compounds
Name	Type of compound	Sweetness
Lactose	Disaccharide	0.16
Maltose	Disaccharide	0.33 – 0.45
Trehalose (α,α-trehalose)	Disaccharide	max. 0.45
Isomaltulose	Disaccharide	0.40 - 0.50
L-serine	Amino acid	0.53 – 0.55
L-proline	Amino acid	0.37 – 0.76
Sorbitol	Polyalcohol	0.6
Galactose	Monosaccharide	0.65
Glucose	Monosaccharide	0.74 – 0.8
Glycine	Amino acid	0.6 – 0.89
L-alanine	Amino acid	0.77 – 1.10
Sucrose	Disaccharide	1.00 (reference)
Xylitol	sugar alcohol	1.02
Fructose	Monosaccharide	1.17 – 1.75
Sodium cyclamate	Sulfonate	26
Steviol glycoside	Glycoside	40 – 300
Aspartame	Dipeptide methyl ester	180 – 250
Acesulfame potassium	Oxathiazinone dioxide	200
Sodium saccharin	Sulfonyl	300 – 675
Sucralose	Modified disaccharide	600
Monellin	Protein	800 to 2000
Thaumatin	Protein	2000
Neotame	Aspartame analog	8000
Sucrooctate	Guanidine	162,000 (estimated)
Bernardame	Guanidine	188,000 (estimated)
Sucrononic acid	Guanidine	200,000 (estimated)
Carrelame	Guanidine	200,000 (estimated)
Lugduname	Guanidine	230,000 (estimated)

Some variation in values is not uncommon between various studies. Such variations may arise from a range of methodological variables, from sampling to analysis and interpretation. Indeed, the taste index of 1, assigned to reference substances such as sucrose (for sweetness), hydrochloric acid (for sourness), quinine (for bitterness), and sodium chloride (for saltiness), is itself arbitrary for practical purposes. Some values, such as those for maltose and glucose, vary little. Others, such as aspartame and sodium saccharin, have much larger variation.

Even some inorganic compounds are sweet, including beryllium chloride and lead(II) acetate. The latter may have contributed to lead poisoning among the ancient Roman aristocracy: the Roman delicacy sapa was prepared by boiling soured wine (containing acetic acid) in lead pots.

Hundreds of synthetic organic compounds are known to be sweet, but only a few of these are legally permitted as food additives. For example, chloroform, nitrobenzene, and ethylene glycol are sweet, but also toxic. Saccharin, cyclamate, aspartame, acesulfame potassium, sucralose, alitame, and neotame are commonly used.

== Sweetness modifiers ==
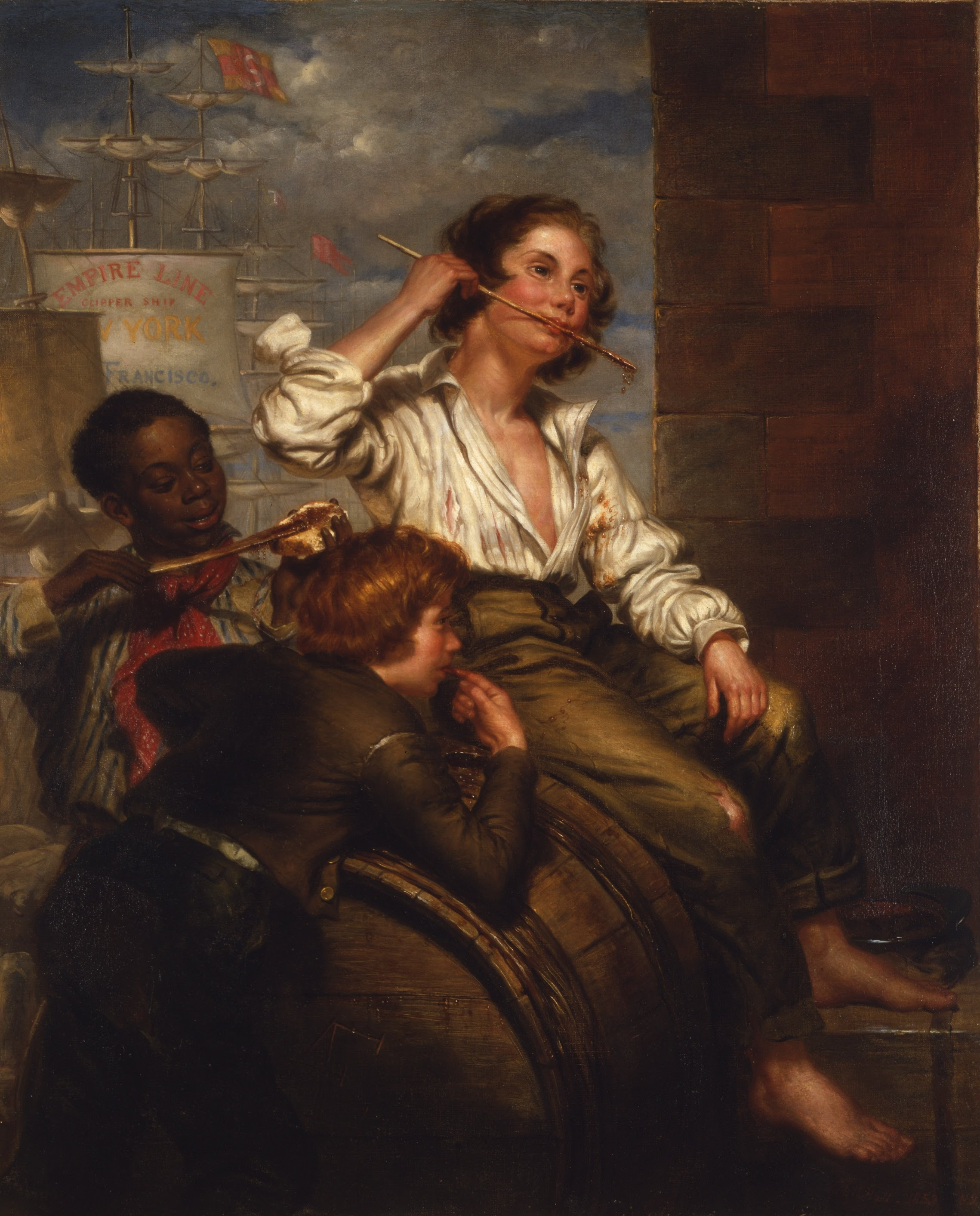
Boys Pilfering Molasses – On The Quays, New Orleans, 1853 painting by George Henry Hall

A few substances alter the way sweet taste is perceived. One class of these inhibits the perception of sweet tastes, whether from sugars or from highly potent sweeteners. Commercially, the most important of these is lactisole, a compound produced by Domino Sugar. It is used in some jellies and other fruit preserves to bring out their fruit flavors by suppressing their otherwise strong sweetness.

Two natural products have been documented to have similar sweetness-inhibiting properties: gymnemic acid, extracted from the leaves of the Indian vine Gymnema sylvestre and ziziphin, from the leaves of the Chinese jujube (Ziziphus jujuba). Gymnemic acid has been widely promoted within herbal medicine as a treatment for sugar cravings and diabetes.

On the other hand, two plant proteins, miraculin and curculin, cause sour foods to taste sweet. Once the tongue has been exposed to either of these proteins, sourness is perceived as sweetness for up to an hour afterwards. While curculin has some innate sweet taste of its own, miraculin is by itself quite tasteless.

== Low-calorie and artificial sweeteners ==
Low-calorie and artificial sweeteners provide sweetness without having to supply energy in the form of calories. They have increased over the years in more products such as beverages and packaged foods. On the other hand, research has shown that non-nutritive sweeteners can cause issues in appetite regulation and gut microbiome composition. Although they do not increase blood glucose levels in a similar way that sugars do, they do have long-term effects on hunger and metabolic health that is still being researched today. For some people, the regular use of artificial sweeteners can change the body's response to sweetness which could lead to dietary patterns.

== The sweetness receptor ==
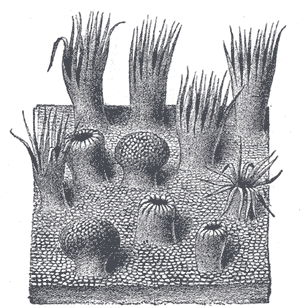
Sweetness is perceived by the taste buds.

Experiments with laboratory mice showed in 2001 that mice possessing different versions of the gene T1R3 prefer sweet foods to different extents. The sweetness receptor in mammals turned out to be a complex of two related proteins, T1R3 and T1R2 (also called TAS1R2 + TAS1R3), that form a G-protein coupled receptor. The cryo-electron microscopy (cryo-EM) structure of the human sweet receptor was solved by scientists at Columbia University in 2025.

Human studies have shown that sweet taste receptors are not only found in the tongue, but also in the lining of the gastrointestinal tract as well as the nasal epithelium, pancreatic islet cells, sperm and testes. It is proposed that the presence of sweet taste receptors in the GI tract controls the feeling of hunger and satiety.

The threshold of sweet taste perception correlates with the time of day, probably due to oscillating leptin levels in blood that may impact the overall sweetness of food. This may be an evolutionary relict of diurnal animals like humans.

Sweetness perception may differ between species significantly. For example, even among primates sweetness is quite variable. New World monkeys do not find aspartame sweet, while Old World monkeys and apes (including most humans) all do. Felids like domestic cats cannot perceive sweetness at all. The ability to taste sweetness may be lost in carnivores who do not eat sweet foods like fruits, including bottlenose dolphins, sea lions, spotted hyenas and fossas.

Signal transaction of the sweet taste

The definition of sweetness begins with the T1R2-T1R3 Receptor, which is a heterodimer which is part of the G-protein that is a coupled receptor family. These receptors are located on the taste buds of the tongue, more specifically in the cell membrane of the receptor cells. When there is a sweet molecule that is connected to the receptor is activated as a G-protein gustducin and this sets off a signal which includes inositol trisphosphate (IP3), calcium release, and the opening of TRPM5 channels. This changes the cell and releases ATP to sensory nerve fibers, which allows sweetness to be recognized.

== Post-ingestive signaling and the gut-brain pathway ==
Gut-brain axis diagram

Sweetness is first detected in the mouth by the T1R2-T1R3 receptor complex, but research has shown that the full taste of sweetness also relies on signals that happen after sugar is swallowed. When sugars are digested in the gastrointestinal tract, the glucose is switched on by nutrient-sensing cells that sends signals to the brain through the vagus nerve. These post-ingestive signals work with dopamine pathways that create our reward and learning, and this means that our preferences for sweet foods is not just determined by taste but it is determined by the metabolic feedback from the gut. This explains why sweet foods might be addicting to a person even when they are not hungry; furthermore, why metabolic state controls how sweet something tastes or how rewarding it feels to eat it.

Research using brain imaging has also shown that sweetness perception happens in two different stages. The first stage happens when the sweet taste is detected in the mouth which activates any sensory areas that use this taste quality. The second stage happens after the sugar is swallowed and metabolized when the glucose begins circulating in the blood stream. At this stage, the reward-related part of the brain (including the striatum and orbitofrontal cortex, show slow increases in activity. This delay does not happen when a sweet substance lacks caloric value, which shows that the body chooses between sweetness that provides energy and sweetness that does not. The metabolic feedback from glucose recreates learning and preferences for energy-rich sweet foods.

Sweetness is signaled in the mouth and the rewarding happens after the sugars reaches the stomach and intestine. Before ingestive nutrient sensing causes hormonal and neural pathways (especially through the vagus nerve) that signal to brain regions include reward and motivation.

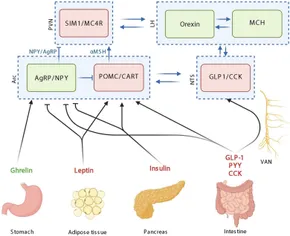
Gut-brain reward pathway

After carbohydrates are digested, the glucose is absorbed and it activates nutrient sensors in the gut. These sensors then send signals to the brain's reward circuits. Some examples include the striatum and orbitofrontal cortex, this is where dopamine releases the preferences for energy rich foods. Sweeteners that had lacked caloric value don't set off delayed metabolic reward, and this explains why caloric sugars can condition stronger learning and craving behavior than the artificial sweeteners.

Research has shown that these gut-driven signals can override the taste experience alone. For example, animals will learn to prefer a calorie containing sweetener even when taste cues are removed. This demonstrates that metabolic reward is a separate and powerful system. This explains how sweet foods can be strengthened when people are not hungry.

== Artificial and low-calorie sweeteners ==
Artificial sweeteners are sweeteners that give sweetness with little to no calories. They are used a lot in the food industry business, especially in beverages, processed foods, and sugar-free products.

Sweet taste receptor diagram

While these compounds stimulate the T1R2-T1R3, their post-ingestive effects are different from sugar itself. Studies have shown that the non-nutritive sweeteners could affect appetite regulation, insulin signaling, and the gut microbiome. Some of the research has been proven that over consumption might break the sweetness from the caloric reward which would change patterns in hunger and dietary consumption over time.

== Sweetness combined with fat and salt ==
Foods that combine sugar, fat, and salt, as commonly found in ultra-processed foods, have a stronger reward response than foods manufactured with sugar, fat or salt alone. Major chronic diseases are closely aligned with these combined ingredients in processed foods, leading to clinical recommendations for limited consumption of sweet, fatty, and salty foods, which are a factor in food addiction, especially in children.

== Sweet receptor pathway ==
To depolarize the cell, and ultimately generate a response, the body uses different cells in the taste bud that each express a receptor for the perception of sweet, sour, salty, bitter or umami. Downstream of the taste receptor, the taste cells for sweet, bitter and umami share the same intracellular signaling pathway. Incoming sweet molecules bind to their receptors, which causes a conformational change in the molecule. This change activates the G-protein, gustducin, which in turn activates phospholipase C to generate inositol trisphosphate (IP_{3}), this subsequently opens the IP_{3}-receptor and induces calcium release from the endoplasmic reticulum. This increase in intracellular calcium activates the TRPM5 channel and induces cellular depolarization. The ATP release channel CALHM1 gets activated by the depolarization and releases ATP neurotransmitter which activates the afferent neurons innervating the taste bud.

== Cognition ==
The color of food can affect sweetness perception. Adding more red color to a drink increases its perceived sweetness. In a study darker colored solutions were rated 2–10% higher than lighter ones despite having 1% less sucrose concentration. The effect of color is believed to be due to cognitive expectations. Some odors smell sweet and memory confuses whether sweetness was tasted or smelled.

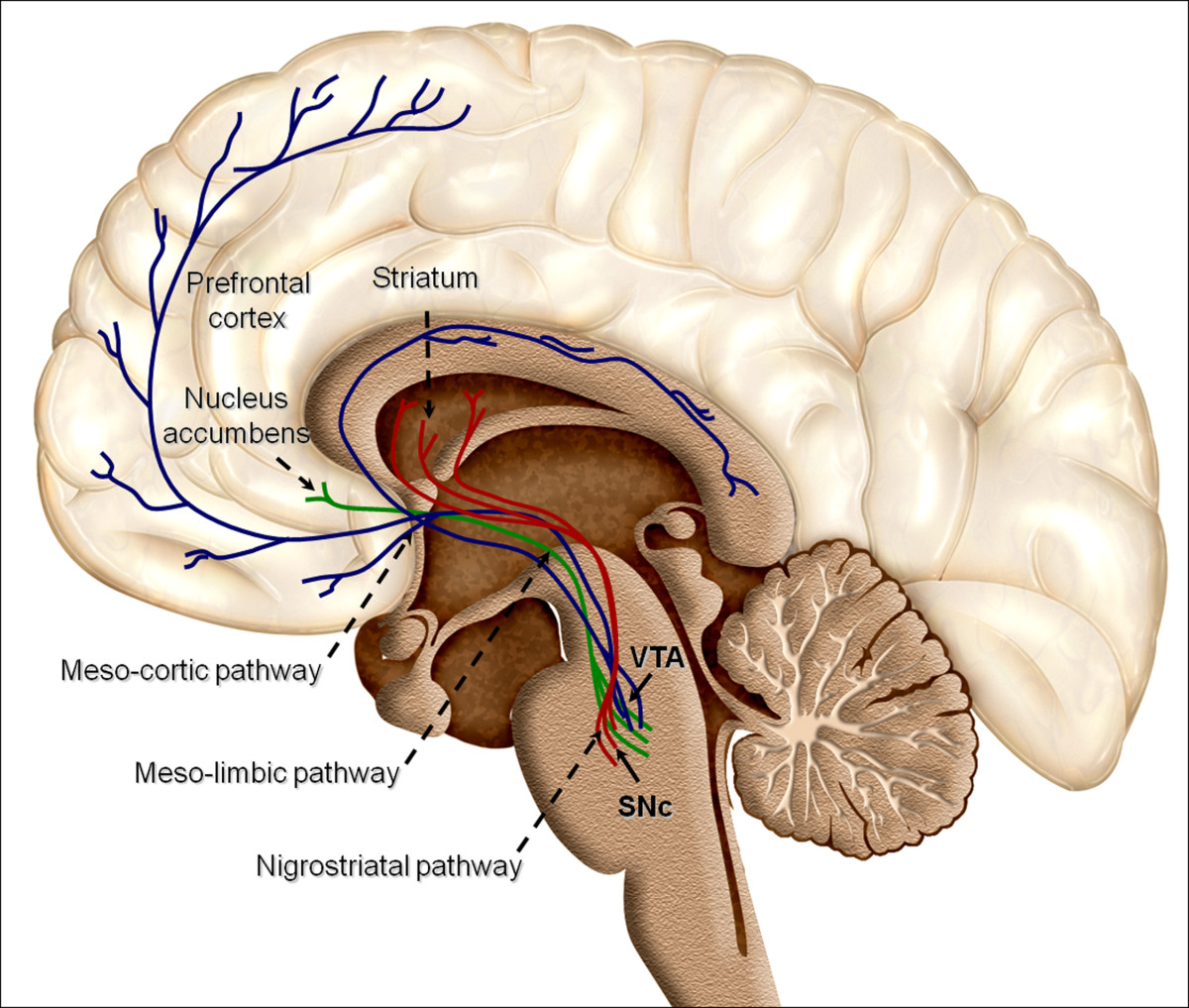
Reward structures in the human brain (dopamine / reward circuit)

Sweetness and eating behavior can be caused by factors such as emotional and environmental. Research in animals has shown that factors between certain environments and fear can decrease eating behavior, even when animals are hungry. In these studies, rats exposed to fear ate less and this finding showed that the desire to consume sweet or energy-rich foods is not just determined by taste or metabolic need. Furthermore, it shows that it can be overridden by emotional contexts and emotional state which plays an important role in shaping when and how we consume sweet foods.

Sweetness perception is shaped by cognitive factors, environment, and color clues. For example:

- Red or darker colored drinks are usually perceived as sweeter even if they have lower sugar concentration.
- Odors that are associated with sweetness can give bias memory or sensing interpretation.
- Emotional cures, like the fear or stress, can reduce the want to eat or consume sweet foods.

== Historical theories ==
Lugduname is the sweetest chemical known.

The development of organic chemistry in the 19th century introduced many new chemical compounds and the means to determine their molecular structures. Early organic chemists tasted many of their products, either intentionally (as a means of characterization) or accidentally (due to poor laboratory hygiene). One of the first attempts to draw systematic correlations between molecules' structures and their tastes was made by a German chemist, Georg Cohn, in 1914. He hypothesized that to evoke a certain taste, a molecule must contain some structural motif (called a sapophore) that produces that taste. With regard to sweetness, he noted that molecules containing multiple hydroxyl groups and those containing chlorine atoms are often sweet, and that among a series of structurally similar compounds, those with smaller molecular weights were often sweeter than the larger compounds.

In 1919, Oertly and Myers proposed a more elaborate theory based on a then-current theory of color in synthetic dyes. They hypothesized that to be sweet, a compound must contain one each of two classes of structural motif, a glucophore and an auxogluc. Based on those compounds known to be sweet at the time, they proposed a list of six candidate glucophores and nine auxoglucs.

From these beginnings in the early 20th century, the theory of sweetness enjoyed little further academic attention until 1963, when Robert Shallenberger and Terry Acree proposed the AH-B theory of sweetness. Simply put, they proposed that to be sweet, a compound must contain a hydrogen bond donor (AH) and a Lewis base (B) separated by about 0.3 nanometres. According to this theory, the AH-B unit of a sweetener binds with a corresponding AH-B unit on the biological sweetness receptor to produce the sensation of sweetness.

The B-X theory was proposed by Lemont Kier in 1972. While previous researchers had noted that among some groups of compounds, there seemed to be a correlation between hydrophobicity and sweetness. This theory formalized these observations by proposing that to be sweet, a compound must have a third binding site (labeled X) that could interact with a hydrophobic site on the sweetness receptor via London dispersion forces. Later researchers have statistically analyzed the distances between the presumed AH, B, and X sites in several families of sweet substances to estimate the distances between these interaction sites on the sweetness receptor.

== MPA theory ==
The most elaborate theory of sweetness to date is the multipoint attachment theory (MPA) proposed by Jean-Marie Tinti and Claude Nofre in 1991. This theory involves a total of eight interaction sites between a sweetener and the sweetness receptor, although not all sweeteners interact with all eight sites. This model has successfully directed efforts aimed at finding highly potent sweeteners, including the most potent family of sweeteners known to date, the guanidine sweeteners. The most potent of these, lugduname, is about 225,000 times sweeter than sucrose.

== Sweetness and food reward ==
Sweet taste works with other nutrients that influence food reward. Research has shown that foods that contain sugars and fat produce a stronger response in the brain's reward system than foods that have sugar and fat alone. This additive effect explains the curiosity and appeal of many processed foods today that uses both high sugar and high fat content. These foods can stimulate reward pathways more intensely than natural sweet foods, and this contributes to cravings and overconsumption. Many of the processed foods are made with high sugar and high fat content, which can activate dopamine-related pathways more strongly than naturally sweet foods. This reward response is linked with the motivation to consume these foods, which leads to cravings and overeating in some people.

== Individual variation in sweetness perception ==
Sweetness perception is different when compared to other people as it determined by genetic physiology and metabolic facts. Recent research has proven that differences in glycemic control, which is how effective a person regulates blood sugar, affects how strongly they learn to prefer sweet foods. The individuals who have weaker glycemic control usually have a stronger reward system with sweet tastes compared to others whose blood sugar control is stable. This finding shows that sweetness can be shaped by metabolic health and taste receptor sensitivity.

== Culture ==
Despite some recorded instances of taboos existing prohibiting sugar consumption, no culture is understood to have held taboos against sweet foods generally.

== Future directions in sweetness research ==
Future research on sweetness has combined with molecular biology, neuroscience, nutrition, and sensory science to understand not just how sweetness is perceived but why individuals respond differently to sweet stimuli. The most transformative developments in the field is the 2025 cyro-electron microscopy structure of the human sweet receptor, TAS1R2-TAS1R3. This helped research in that it revealed the exact binding pockets and the conformational states involved in sweet detection. This helped bring a design of next generation sweeteners that would be activate the receptor whilst being able to minimize aftertastes or the metabolic concerns.

The structural work also supports efforts to design selective modulators that can subdue sweetness perception. These compounds can allow food manufacturers to reduce total sugar content while being able to keep desirable flavor profiles. At the same time, researchers are finding ways on how receptor variants can shape individual differences in sweet sensitivity and preference patterns. Studies show that heritable variation can affect how people perceive both natural and synthetic sweeteners.

Another research involves the gut brain axis, which has changed scientific understanding of why sweetness is rewarding. Original models explained mostly the oral taste alone, but recent studies have shown post-ingestive glucose signaling activates dopamine pathways in the striatum and orbitofrontal cortex which changes preferences for caloric sweet foods even when sweetness intensity is constant. These findings show why artificial sweeteners fail to produce the same level of satisfaction and could cause disruption in appetite regulation.

Future studies are trying to examine how metabolic health affects learning processes tied to sweet taste. This is more common in glycemic control research. Recent findings have shown that individuals with poorer glycemic regulation from stronger rewards with sweet foods. This research can inform individuals of personalized nutrition or obesity prevention strategies.

From these studies and developments, this shows that the future of sweetness research expands further than taste buds. By adding receptor biology, gut brain signaling, genetics, sensory psychology, and metabolic health, researchers are trying to develop safer sweeteners for personalized dietary recommendations. Also, for healthier food environments that match with human biology instead of trying to replace it.

== See also ==
- Sugar substitute
- Sugar alcohol
