= Gurmarin =

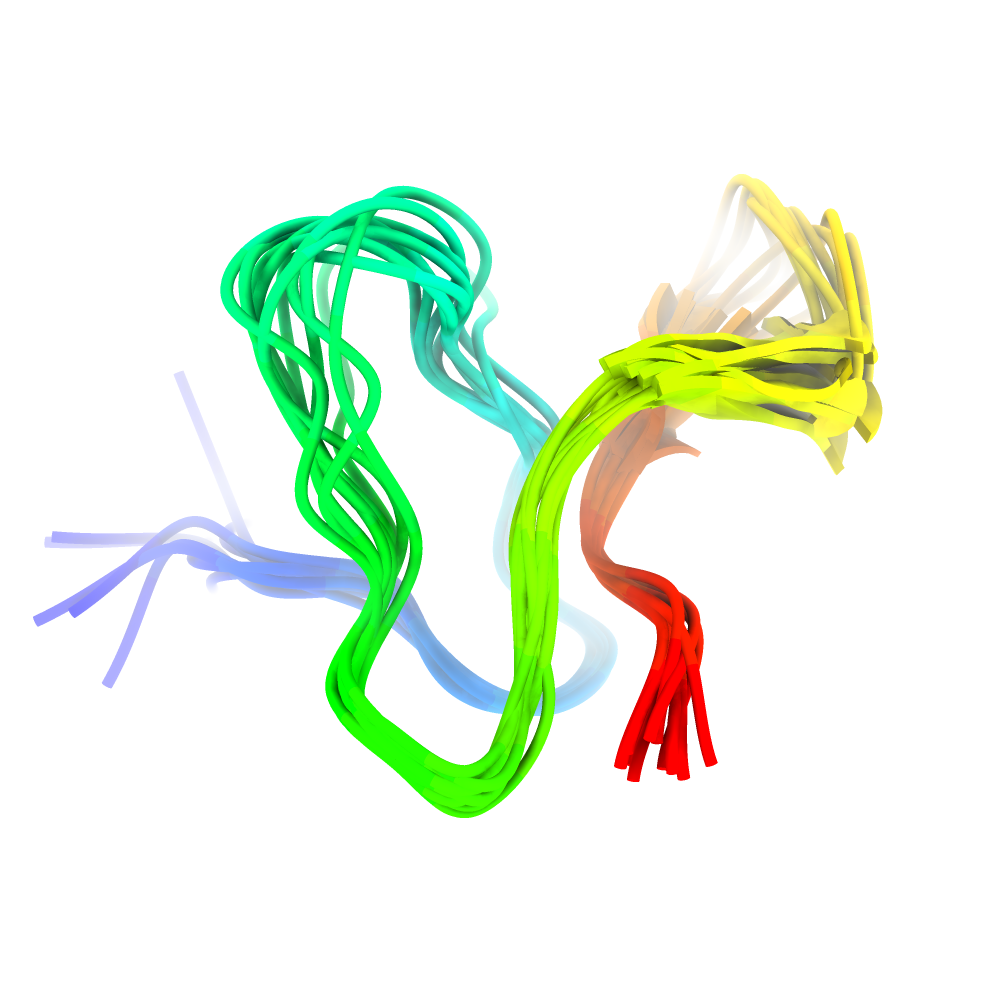
- Structure of gurmarin, a sweet taste-suppressing polypeptide.

Identifiers
- Symbol: Gurmarin
- Pfam: PF11410
- InterPro: IPR010485
- SCOP2: 1gur / SCOPe / SUPFAM
- OPM superfamily: 112
- OPM protein: 1c4e
Available protein structures:
- PDB: IPR010485 PF11410 (ECOD; PDBsum)
- AlphaFold: IPR010485; PF11410

Gurmarin

Identifiers
- Organism: Gymnema sylvestre
- Symbol: ?
- Orthologs: OMA: entry
- PDB: 1C4E
- UniProt: P25810
Search for
- Structures: Swiss-model
- Domains: InterPro

Gurmarin is a 35-residue polypeptide from the Asclepiad vine Gymnema sylvestre (Gurmar). It has been utilized as a pharmacological tool in the study of sweet-taste transduction because of its ability to selectively inhibit the neural response to sweet taste in rats. This rat inhibition appears to have high specificity to sugar (sweetener) molecules like sucrose, glucose, and saccharin as well as the amino acid glycine. As a sweet-taste-suppressing protein, Gurmarin shows signs of being reversible in nature although having little to no effect on the sweet taste sensation in humans suggesting the protein is only active on rodent sweet taste receptors.

== Structure and inhibitory effect ==
Gurmarin is a peptide used to eliminate sweet taste through electrophysiological conditions. It is different from other substances such as gymnemic acid, ziziphin, and hodulcine. This is because these substances are known to suppress sweet taste sensation. It consists of 35 amino acid units and 3 disulfide linkages. It is a member of inhibitor cystine knot peptides (ICK), which are highly stable proteins formed by three disulfide bonds. These ICK peptides are renowned for their remarkable stability, primarily due to the presence of three disulfide bonds. They are not exclusive to only gurmarin, they have also been discovered in a wide variety of organisms, including plants, fungi, vertebrates, and arthropods.

Gurmarin has an inhibitory effect that is found to be reversible, but it is found that there are several hours necessary for recovery of sweet tastes which impairs the perception of sweetness. It is found that beta-cyclodextrin solution can effectively remove gurmarin from the taste tissue. About 70% of glucose-excited neurons in the arcuate nucleus are inhibited by gurmarin. This demonstrates that gurmarin has the ability to inhibit the activation of the receptor, which therefore affects the impact on feeding behavior and the maintenance of energy.

== Impact on umami taste ==
Although gurmarin's inhibitory action is highly specific to sweet taste, it also impacts umami taste. Umami taste usually contains high levels of amino acid glutamate. This suggests that there is a relationship between the two, sweet and umami taste. It is found that the interaction site of gurmarin is the apical membrane of taste cells, which is notably influenced by the pH environment. In rats, it was found that gurmarin suppressed the response of the chorda tympani (CT) nerve in rats, but it did not affect the responses of the glossopharyngeal (GL) nerve to any tastes that were tested which included umami substances (US).

== Influence on the central nervous system ==
Gurmarin influences the central nervous system. Many nuclei of the solitary tract neurons were found to be highly sensitive to gurmarin. This indicates that there are multiple receptor mechanisms that allow for sweet taste in the central nervous system. Some solitary tract neurons had exhibited the ability to continuously respond to the gurmarin inhibitory effects of sweet taste, even after treatment. This raises the suggestion that there is synaptic coupling among the taste receptor cells driven by the gurmarin-sensitive and -insensitive receptor mechanisms.

== Diabetic and therapeutic effects ==
Gurmarin can play a role in the field of managing diabetes. It is one of many active compounds that are of high interest as an antidiabetic. As mentioned, it is derived from Gurmar. Gurmar represents a positive contribution to blood sugar and has the ability to control the cravings of sugar. This means it ultimately reduces the amount of sugar intake. Gurmarin is one of many active compounds found through the insulin secretion from beta cells in the pancreas.

As a herb, gurmarin being a polypeptide of Gymnema sylvestre, it has a broad range of therapeutic effects for other health conditions. This encompasses conditions such as arthritis, diuretic properties, anemia, osteoporosis, high cholesterol levels, heart conditions, asthma, digestive discomfort, microbial infections, indigestion, and concerns related to inflammation. It even has shown as a benefit to maintaining weight and lowering both blood cholesterol levels and triglyceride concentrations.
