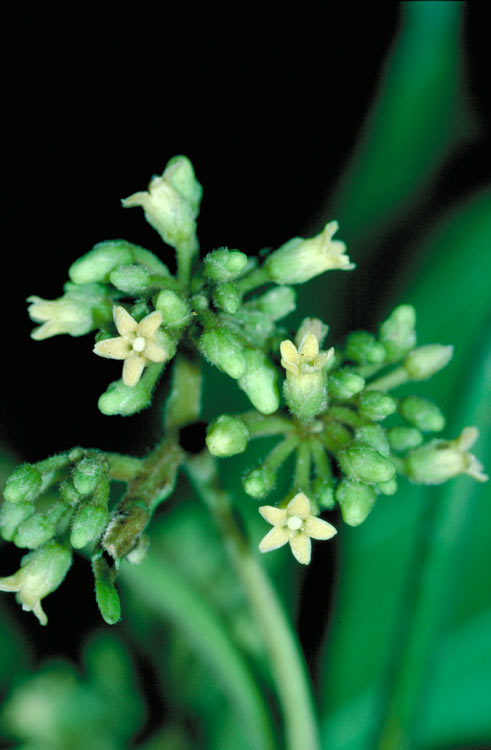
- Flowers

Conservation status
- Least Concern (NCA)

Scientific classification
- Kingdom: Plantae
- Clade: Tracheophytes
- Clade: Angiosperms
- Clade: Eudicots
- Clade: Asterids
- Order: Gentianales
- Family: Apocynaceae
- Genus: Gymnema
- Species: G. longipedicellatum

Binomial name
- Gymnema longipedicellatum (P.I.Forst.) P.I.Forst.

Synonyms
- Marsdenia longipedicellata P.I.Forst.

= Gymnema longipedicellatum =

Species of flowering plant

Gymnema longipedicellatum is a species of plant in the oleander and frangipani family Apocynaceae. It is endemic to the Wet Tropics bioregion of Queensland, Australia, and ranges from Cape Tribulation to Mission Beach. It was first described (as Marsdenia longipedicellata) in 1995 by Australian botanist Paul Irwin Forster, then transferred to its current name in 2021. It has been assigned the conservation status of least concern.
