= Gymnema lactiferum =

Ceylon cow-tree

Scientific classification
- Kingdom: Plantae
- Clade: Tracheophytes
- Clade: Angiosperms
- Clade: Eudicots
- Clade: Asterids
- Order: Gentianales
- Family: Apocynaceae
- Genus: Gymnema
- Species: G. lactiferum

Binomial name
- Gymnema lactiferum (L.) R.Br. ex Schult.

Species of plant

Gymnema lactiferum, the Ceylon cow-tree or Ceylon cow plant, is a species of climbing perennial shrub native to India and Sri Lanka. In Sanskrit it is called ksirakakoli. James Emerson Tennent described the use of the plant in his account of Ceylon (Sri Lanka), and wrote it was "evidently a form of the G. sylvestre". The milky juice of this plant has been said to be used as a substitute for milk and cream, but it is believed to contain enough of the poisonous principle peculiar to the order (a poisonous substance that is specific to the order) to cast a doubt upon this reputed use.
