= Sucrononic acid =

Identifiers
CAS Number	116869-55-7
3D model (JSmol)	Interactive image
ChemSpider	14626977
PubChem CID	19855121
UNII	GWF6GWL475
CompTox Dashboard (EPA)	DTXSID90600634
- InChI: InChI=1S/C19H26N4O2/c20-13-15-9-11-17(12-10-15)23-19(21-14-18(24)25)22-16-7-5-3-1-2-4-6-8-16/h9-12,16H,1-8,14H2,(H,24,25)(H2,21,22,23) Key: LBDVSPIQWSQRLB-UHFFFAOYSA-N; InChI=1/C19H26N4O2/c20-13-15-9-11-17(12-10-15)23-19(21-14-18(24)25)22-16-7-5-3-1-2-4-6-8-16/h9-12,16H,1-8,14H2,(H,24,25)(H2,21,22,23) Key: LBDVSPIQWSQRLB-UHFFFAOYAR
- SMILES: OC(=O)CN/C(=N\c1ccc(C#N)cc1)NC2CCCCCCCC2

Properties
Chemical formula	C_{19}H_{26}N_{4}O_{2}
Molar mass	342.44 g/mol
- Except where otherwise noted, data are given for materials in their standard state (at 25 °C [77 °F], 100 kPa). verify (what is ?) Infobox references

Sucronic acid is a guanidine derivative artificial sweetener. It is one of the most potent sweeteners known, with a sweetness 200,000 times that of sucrose (table sugar).

It has not been approved for use in food.

Sucronic acid belongs to a family of guanidines substituted with acetic acid, some of which are ultrapotent sweeteners:

- Lugduname (230,000x at equivalent concentration)
- Carrelame (200,000x at equivalent concentration)
- Bernardame (188,000x at equivalent concentration)
- Sucrooctate (162,000x at equivalent concentration)
