= C19H26N4O2 =

The molecular formula C_{19}H_{26}N_{4}O_{2} may refer to:

- BIMU8, a drug which acts as a 5-HT4 receptor selective agonist
- ADB-4en-PINACA, a cannabinoid designer drug
- Sucrononic acid, a guanidino derivative artificial sweetener
