= Gymnema elegans =

Scientific classification
- Kingdom: Plantae
- Clade: Tracheophytes
- Clade: Angiosperms
- Clade: Eudicots
- Clade: Asterids
- Order: Gentianales
- Family: Apocynaceae
- Genus: Gymnema
- Species: G. elegans

Binomial name
- Gymnema elegans Wight & Arn., 1834

Synonyms
- Bidaria elegans Decne.

Species of plant

Gymnema elegans is a species of plants in the family Apocynaceae. It is found in Tamil Nadu.
