= Lemont Kier =

American chemist and researcher

Lemont Burwell Kier (September 13, 1930 - Jan 2, 2024) was an American chemist and researcher in the field of drug design and medicinal chemistry. He was the recipient of the American Association of Pharmaceutical Scientists 2008 Research Achievement Award in Drug Development and Discovery. Kier obtained his PhD in Medicinal Chemistry at the University of Minnesota in 1958. His last position was Professor Emeritus of Medicinal Chemistry and Nurse Anesthesia at Virginia Commonwealth University in Richmond, Virginia. He participated in the founding of the Center for the Study of Biological Complexity at Virginia Commonwealth University.

== Work ==
Kier built one of the first models in which molecular orbital theory was applied successfully to drug design and development. Later, he and his colleague, Lowell Hall, developed what is now called the "Kier-Hall Index" to describe molecular connectivity. His particular expertise in the question “How do chemical modifications affect particular physical properties of drugs?” has been used to develop the theory of the interaction of general anesthetic gases with the body, and the theory of taste (and in particular, sweetness).

Professor Kier is the author or co-author of eight books: Molecular Orbital Theory In Drug Research; Molecular Connectivity In Chemistry and Drug Research; Molecular Connectivity in Structure Activity Analysis; Molecular Structure Description: The Electrotopological State; Medicinal Chemistry and Physics for Nurse Anesthetists; Cellular Automata Modeling of Chemical Systems; and Science and Complexity for Life Science Students.
