= BIMU8 =

Chemical compound

Identifiers
- IUPAC name: N-[(1R,5S)-8-methyl-8-azabicyclo[3.2.1]oct-3-yl]-2-oxo-3-(propan-2-yl)-2,3-dihydro-1H-benzimidazole-1-carboxamide hydrochloride
- CAS Number: 134296-40-5
- PubChem CID: 5311028
- ChemSpider: 4470566

Chemical and physical data
- Formula: C_{19}H_{26}N_{4}O_{2}· HCl
- 3D model (JSmol): Interactive image
- SMILES: Cl.O=C2N(c1ccccc1N2C(=O)NC4C[C@H]3N(C)[C@H](CC3)C4)C(C)C
- InChI: InChI=1S/C19H26N4O2.ClH/c1-12(2)22-16-6-4-5-7-17(16)23(19(22)25)18(24)20-13-10-14-8-9-15(11-13)21(14)3;/h4-7,12-15H,8-11H2,1-3H3,(H,20,24);1H/t13?,14-,15+; Key:NQYXXIUVFVOJCX-XZPOUAKSSA-N

BIMU-8 is a drug which acts as a 5-HT_{4} receptor selective agonist. BIMU-8 was one of the first compounds of this class. The main action of BIMU-8 is to increase the rate of respiration by activating an area of the brain stem known as the pre-Botzinger complex.

== Uses ==
The most obvious practical use of BIMU-8 is to combine it with opioid analgesic drugs in order to counteract the dangerous respiratory depression which can occur when opioids are used in excessive doses. BIMU-8 does not affect the pleasurable or painkilling properties of opiates, which means that if combined with BIMU-8, large therapeutic doses of opiates could theoretically be given to humans without risking a decrease in breathing rate. Studies have shown BIMU-8 to be effective in rats at counteracting the respiratory depression caused by the potent opioid fentanyl, which has caused many accidental deaths in humans. However, no human trials of BIMU-8 have yet been carried out.

Other studies have suggested a role for 5-HT_{4} agonists in learning and memory, and BIMU-8 was found to increase conditioned responses in mice, so this drug might also be useful for improving memory in humans.

Some other selective 5-HT_{4} agonists such as mosapride and tegaserod (the only 5-HT_{4} agonists currently licensed for use in humans) have been found not to reduce respiratory depression. On the other hand, another 5-HT_{4} agonist, zacopride, does inhibit respiratory depression in a similar manner to BIMU-8.

This suggests that either the anti-respiratory depression action is mediated via a specific subtype of the 5-HT_{4} receptor which is activated by BIMU-8 and zacopride, but not by mosapride or tegaserod, or alternatively there may be functional selectivity involved whereby BIMU-8 and zacopride produce a different physiological response following 5-HT_{4} binding compared to other 5-HT_{4} agonists. Another alternative to this is that the 5-HT_{4} agonist currently available for use in humans do not have great enough potency or bioavailability in the brain to elicit the same effects.

== Other activity ==
Along with several other 5-HT_{4} ligands, BIMU-8 was also found to possess significant affinity for the sigma receptors, acting as a σ_{2} antagonist. It is unclear as yet what contribution this additional activity makes to the pharmacological profile of BIMU-8 and other 5-HT_{4} ligands that also show sigma affinity.

== See also ==
- C_{19}H_{26}N_{4}O_{2}
