= Gymnemic acid =

Gymnemic acids are a class of chemical compounds isolated from the leaves of Gymnema sylvestre (Apocynaceae). They are anti-sweet compounds, or sweetness inhibitors. After chewing the leaves, solutions sweetened with sugar taste like water.

Chemically, gymnemic acids are triterpenoid glycosides. The central structure is the aglycone gymnemagenin (C_{30}H_{50}O_{6}). This is adorned with a sugar such as glucuronic acid and with various ester groups. These variations give rise to the different gymnemic acids. More than 20 homologs of gymnemic acid are known.

Gymnemic acid I has the highest anti-sweet properties. It suppresses the sweetness of most of the sweeteners including intense artificial sweeteners such as aspartame and natural sweeteners such as thaumatin, a sweet protein. The anti-sweet activity is reversible, but sweetness recovery on the tongue can take more than 10 minutes.

== Example chemical structures ==
Gymnemic acids
| Chemical structure | | | | |
| Name | Gymnemic acid I | Gymnemic acid II | Gymnemic acid III | Gymnemic acid IV |
| R^{1} | tigloyl | 2-methylbutanoyl | 2-methylbutanoyl | tigloyl |
| R^{2} | acetyl | acetyl | H | H |
| CAS Number | 122168-40-5 | 122144-48-3 | 122074-65-1 | 121903-96-6 |
| PubChem ID | 11953919 | 91617872 | 14264066 | 14264063 |
| Chemical formula | C_{43}H_{66}O_{14} | C_{43}H_{68}O_{14} | C_{41}H_{66}O_{13} | C_{41}H_{64}O_{13} |
| Molar mass (g/mol) | 806.98 | 809.00 | 766.97 | 764.95 |

== See also ==
Other anti-sweeteners:

- Hodulcine, a dammarane-type triterpene glycoside from the leaves of Hovenia dulcis
- Lactisole, sodium 2-(4-methoxyphenoxy)propanoate
- Ziziphin, a triterpene glycoside, C_{51}H_{80}O_{18}
- Gurmarin
