= Lactisole =

- Lactisole

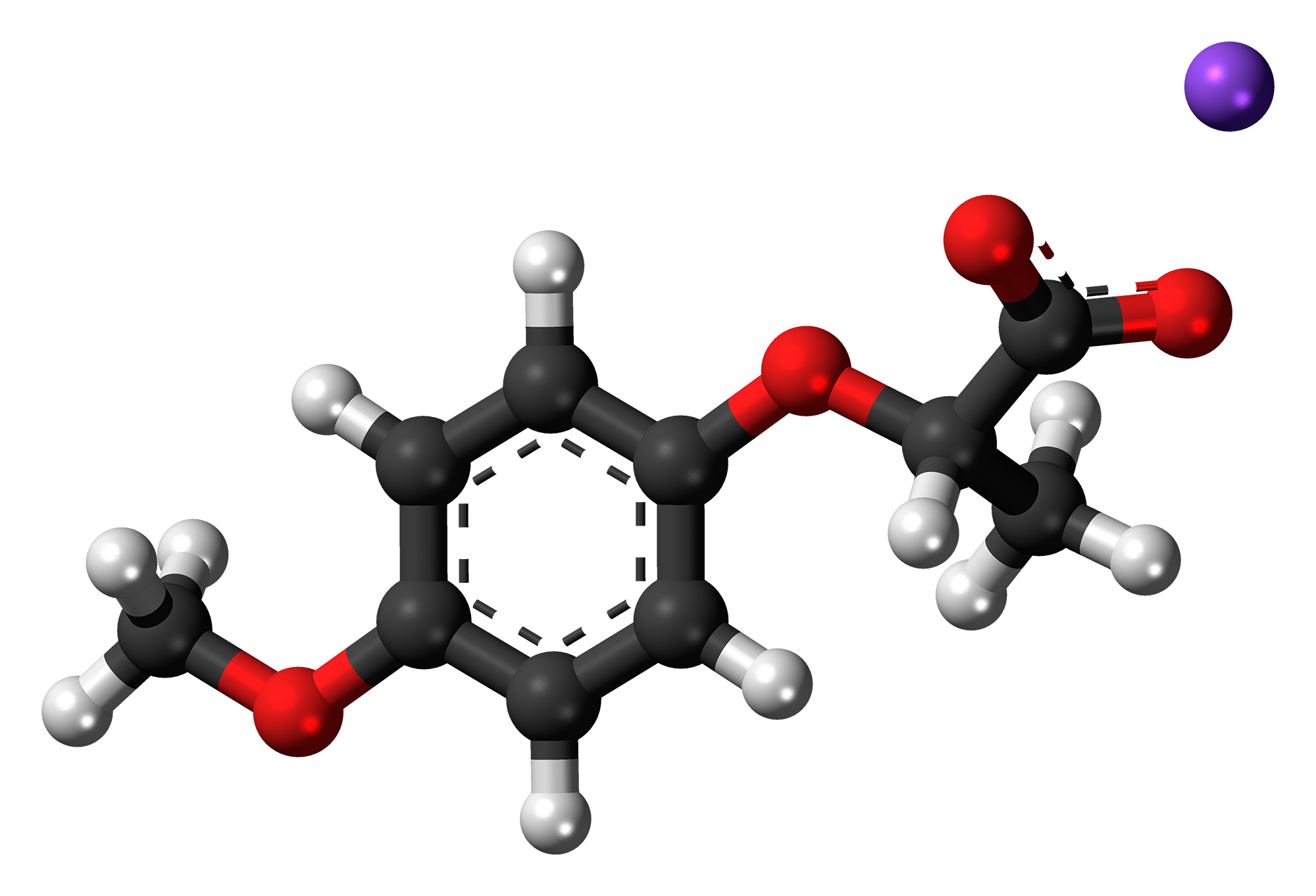

Names
- IUPAC name Sodium 2-(4-methoxyphenoxy)propanoate
- Other names: Lactisole; ORP 178; Propanoic acid, 2-(4-methoxyphenoxy), sodium salt

Identifiers
CAS Number	150436-68-3
3D model (JSmol)	Interactive image
ChemSpider	4515110
ECHA InfoCard	100.123.510
PubChem CID	5362606
UNII	ZU3D90W5GZ
CompTox Dashboard (EPA)	DTXSID60934059
- InChI: InChI=1S/C10H12O4.Na/c1-7(10(11)12)14-9-5-3-8(13-2)4-6-9;/h3-7H,1-2H3,(H,11,12);/q;+1/p-1 Key: SKORRGYRKQDXRS-UHFFFAOYSA-M; InChI=1/C10H12O4.Na/c1-7(10(11)12)14-9-5-3-8(13-2)4-6-9;/h3-7H,1-2H3,(H,11,12);/q;+1/p-1 Key: SKORRGYRKQDXRS-REWHXWOFAP
- SMILES: [Na+].[O-]C(=O)C(Oc1ccc(OC)cc1)C

Properties
Chemical formula	C_{10}H_{11}O_{4}Na
Molar mass	218.188 g/mol
Appearance	white to pale cream, crystalline solid
Melting point	190 °C (374 °F; 463 K)
Solubility in water	Soluble
Solubility	Soluble in propylene glycol Slightly soluble in fat Miscible in ethanol
- Except where otherwise noted, data are given for materials in their standard state (at 25 °C [77 °F], 100 kPa). verify (what is ?) Infobox references

Lactisole is the sodium salt and commonly supplied form of 2-(4-methoxyphenoxy)propionic acid, a natural carboxylic acid found in roasted coffee beans. Like gymnemic acid, it has the property of masking sweet flavors and is used for this purpose in the food industry.

== Chemistry ==
Chemically, lactisole is a double ether of hydroquinone. Since it contains an asymmetric carbon atom, the molecule is chiral, with the (S)-enantiomer predominating in natural sources and being primarily responsible for the sweetness-masking effect. Commercial lactisole is a racemic mixture of the (R)- and (S)-forms.

== Natural occurrences ==
The parent acid of lactisole was discovered in 1989 in roasted Colombian arabica coffee beans in a concentration of 0.5 to 1.2 ppm.

== Anti-sweet properties ==
At concentrations of 100–150 parts per million in food, lactisole largely suppresses the ability to perceive sweet tastes, both from sugar and from artificial sweeteners such as aspartame. A 12% sucrose solution was perceived like a 4% sucrose solution when lactisole was added. However, it is significantly less efficient than gymnemic acid with acesulfame potassium, sucrose, glucose and sodium saccharin. Research found also that it has no effect on the perception of bitterness, sourness and saltiness. According to a recent study, lactisole acts on a sweet taste receptor heteromer of the TAS1R3 sweet protein receptor in humans, but not on its rodent counterpart.

== As a food additive ==
The principal use of lactisole is in jellies, jams, and similar preserved fruit products containing large amounts of sugar. In these products, by suppressing sugar's sweetness, it allows fruit flavors to come through. In the United States, lactisole is designated as generally recognized as safe (GRAS) by the Flavor and Extract Manufacturers Association (Fema number: 3773) and approved for use in food as flavoring agent up to 150 ppm. Currently, lactisole is manufactured and sold by Domino Sugar and its usage levels are between 50 and 150 ppm. In the European Union lactisole is allowed to be used as a flavouring substance in foods, FL No. 16.041.

== See also ==
- Gymnemic acid
- Hodulcine
- Ziziphin
