= Carrelame =

Names
- IUPAC name (Z)-N-{[(3,5-Dichlorophenyl)amino][(diphenylmethyl)amino]methylene}glycine

Identifiers
CAS Number	180045-74-3
3D model (JSmol)	Interactive image
ChEMBL	ChEMBL2220782
ChemSpider	26468003
PubChem CID	46841915
UNII	EFC6W76KJN
CompTox Dashboard (EPA)	DTXSID40676748
- InChI: InChI=1S/C22H19Cl2N3O2/c23-17-11-18(24)13-19(12-17)26-22(25-14-20(28)29)27-21(15-7-3-1-4-8-15)16-9-5-2-6-10-16/h1-13,21H,14H2,(H,28,29)(H2,25,26,27) Key: QMIBAVZANYVPEF-UHFFFAOYSA-N; InChI=1/C22H19Cl2N3O2/c23-17-11-18(24)13-19(12-17)26-22(25-14-20(28)29)27-21(15-7-3-1-4-8-15)16-9-5-2-6-10-16/h1-13,21H,14H2,(H,28,29)(H2,25,26,27) Key: QMIBAVZANYVPEF-UHFFFAOYAI
- SMILES: c1ccc(cc1)C(c2ccccc2)N/C(=N/CC(=O)O)/Nc3cc(cc(c3)Cl)Cl

Properties
Chemical formula	C_{22}H_{19}Cl_{2}N_{3}O_{2}
Molar mass	428.31 g·mol^{−1}
- Except where otherwise noted, data are given for materials in their standard state (at 25 °C [77 °F], 100 kPa). Infobox references

Carrelame is an extremely high potency artificial sweetener of the guanidine class, closely related to lugduname. While carrelame is roughly 200,000 times as sweet as sucrose, lugduname is still somewhat sweeter. It appears safe in pigs.

== See also ==
- Sucrononic acid

== Additional reading ==
- O'Brien-Nabors, Lyn (19 April 2016). Alternative Sweeteners. CRC Press. ISBN 9781439846155.
- Corti, Antonietta (January 1999). Low-calorie Sweeteners - Google Books. Karger Medical and Scientific Publishers. ISBN 9783805569385.
- Spillane, W. J. (17 July 2006). Optimising Sweet Taste in Foods - Google Books. Woodhead. ISBN 9781845691646.
