= Lugduname =

Potent sweetener

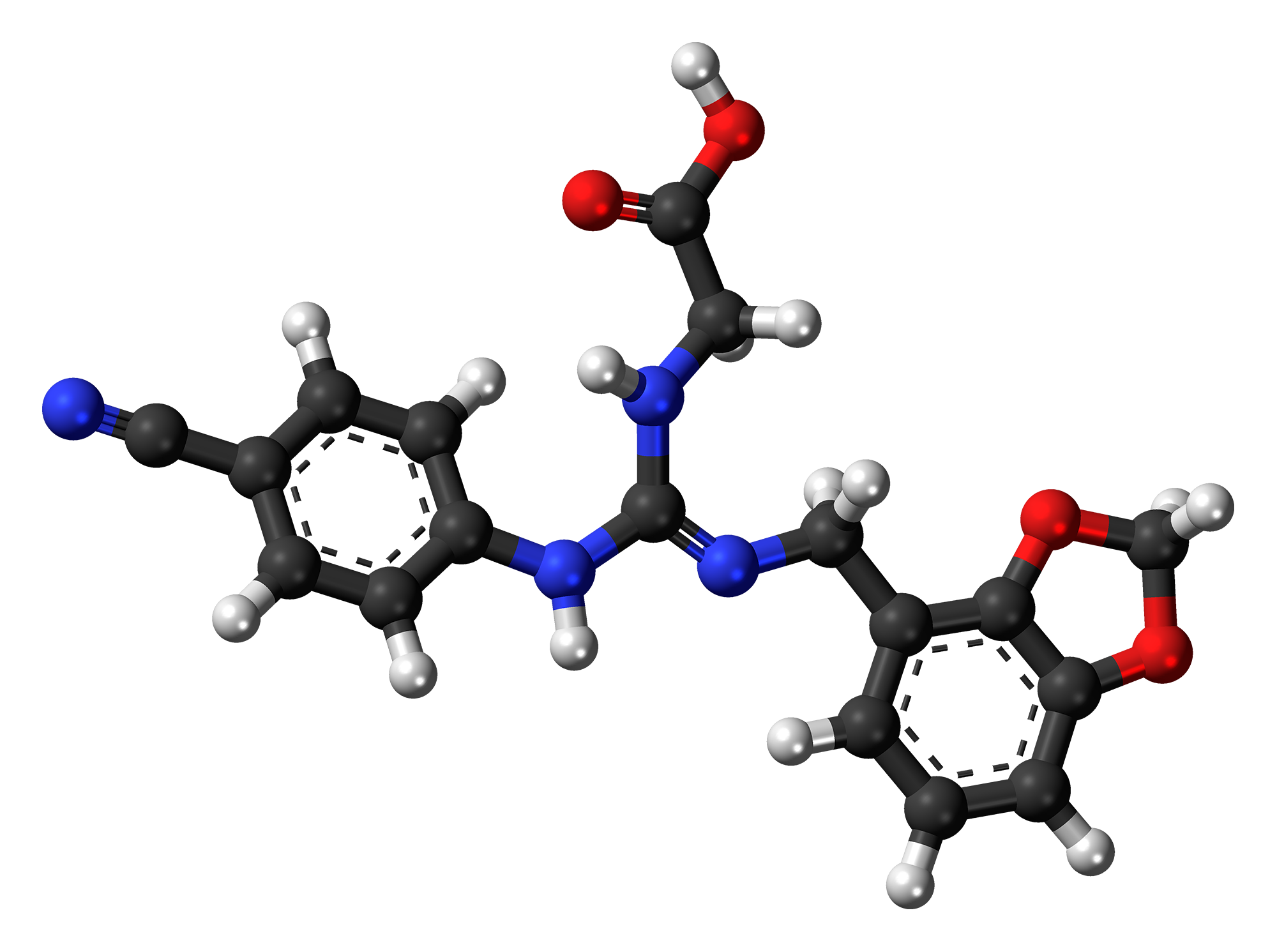

Names
- IUPAC name N′-(4-Cyanophenyl)-N′′-(2,3-methylenedioxybenzyl)guanidinoacetic acid

Identifiers
| CAS Number | 180045-75-4 |
| 3D model (JSmol) | Interactive image |
| ChemSpider | 21106452 |
| PubChem CID | 57459281 |
| UNII | 832G2PE2QQ |
| CompTox Dashboard (EPA) | DTXSID20726659 |
- InChI: InChI=1S/C18H16N4O4/c19-8-12-4-6-14(7-5-12)22-18(21-10-16(23)24)20-9-13-2-1-3-15-17(13)26-11-25-15/h1-7H,9-11H2,(H,23,24)(H2,20,21,22) Key: IHKGGKRBWGTNNG-UHFFFAOYSA-N; InChI=1/C18H16N4O4/c19-8-12-4-6-14(7-5-12)22-18(21-10-16(23)24)20-9-13-2-1-3-15-17(13)26-11-25-15/h1-7H,9-11H2,(H,23,24)(H2,20,21,22) Key: IHKGGKRBWGTNNG-UHFFFAOYAL
- SMILES: N#Cc1ccc(cc1)N/C(NCC(O)=O)=N\Cc2cccc3OCOc23

Properties
| Chemical formula | C_{18}H_{16}N_{4}O_{4} |
| Molar mass | 352.350 g·mol^{−1} |
- Except where otherwise noted, data are given for materials in their standard state (at 25 °C [77 °F], 100 kPa). verify (what is ?) Infobox references

Lugduname (from lat. Lugdunum for Lyon) is one of the most potent sweetening agents known. Lugduname has been estimated to be between 220,000 and 300,000 times as sweet as sucrose (table sugar), with estimates varying between studies. It was developed at the University of Lyon in 1996. Lugduname is part of a family of potent sweeteners which contain acetic acid functional groups attached to guanidine.

== See also ==
- Carrelame
- Sucrononic acid
