= Ziziphin =

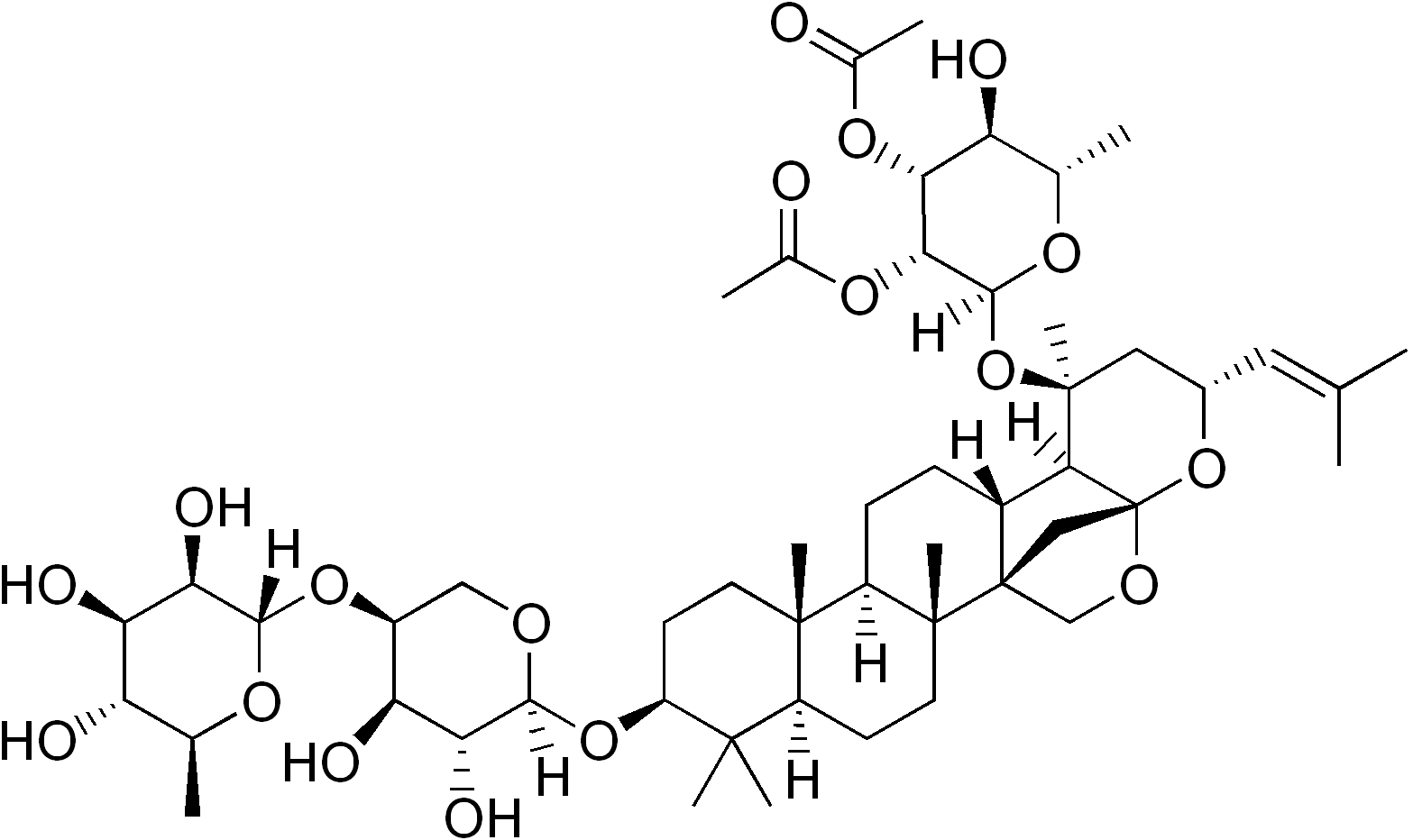

Names
- IUPAC name (23R)-3β-[α-L-Rhamnopyranosyl-(1→4)-α-L-arabinopyranosyloxy]-16β,23:16α,30-diepoxydammar-24-en-20-yl α-L-rhamnopyranoside 2,3-diacetate
- Systematic IUPAC name (1^{2}S,1^{3}R,1^{4}R,1^{5}S,1^{6}S,3^{1}S,3^{3}R,3^{4a}S,3^{6a}S,3^{6b}R,3^{8a}R,3^{10}S,3^{12a}R,3^{12b}R,3^{14a}R,3^{14b}S,5^{2}S,5^{3}R,5^{4}R,5^{5}S,7^{2}S,7^{3}R,7^{4}R,7^{5}R,7^{6}S)-1^{5},5^{3},5^{4},7^{3},7^{4},7^{5}-Hexahydroxy-1^{6},3^{1},3^{6b},3^{9},3^{9},3^{12a},7^{6}-heptamethyl-3^{3}-(2-methylprop-1-en-1-yl)hexadecahydro-3^{6}H,3^{8}H-2,4,6-trioxa-3(1,10)-[4a,6a]methanophenanthro[2,1-d]pyrano[2,3-b]pyrana-1,7(2),5(2,5)-tris(oxana)heptaphane-1^{3},1^{4}-diyl diacetate

Identifiers
CAS Number	73667-51-3
3D model (JSmol)	Interactive image
ChEBI	CHEBI:10120
ChemSpider	390526
KEGG	C08991
PubChem CID	441957
CompTox Dashboard (EPA)	DTXSID00905122
- InChI: InChI=1S/C51H80O18/c1-23(2)18-28-19-49(11,69-45-41(65-27(6)53)40(64-26(5)52)35(55)25(4)63-45)42-29-12-13-32-47(9)16-15-33(46(7,8)31(47)14-17-48(32,10)50(29)21-51(42,68-28)61-22-50)67-43-38(58)36(56)30(20-60-43)66-44-39(59)37(57)34(54)24(3)62-44/h18,24-25,28-45,54-59H,12-17,19-22H2,1-11H3/t24-,25-,28-,29+,30-,31-,32+,33-,34-,35-,36-,37+,38+,39+,40+,41+,42-,43-,44-,45-,47-,48+,49-,50-,51-/m0/s1 Key: SPFBVQWRJFUDBB-FYBFSNJASA-N
- SMILES: C[C@H]1[C@@H]([C@H]([C@H]([C@@H](O1)O[C@H]2CO[C@H]([C@@H]([C@H]2O)O)O[C@H]3CC[C@@]4([C@H]5CC[C@@H]6[C@H]7[C@@](C[C@@H](O[C@@]78C[C@]6([C@@]5(CC[C@H]4C3(C)C)C)CO8)C=C(C)C)(C)O[C@H]9[C@@H]([C@@H]([C@H]([C@@H](O9)C)O)OC(=O)C)OC(=O)C)C)O)O)O

Properties
Chemical formula	C_{51}H_{80}O_{18}
Molar mass	981.17 g/mol
Density	1.345 g/cm^{3}
- Except where otherwise noted, data are given for materials in their standard state (at 25 °C [77 °F], 100 kPa). verify (what is ?) Infobox references

Ziziphin, a triterpene glycoside which exhibits taste-modifying properties, has been isolated from the leaves of Ziziphus jujuba (Rhamnaceae).

Among ziziphin's known homologues found in this plant, it is the most anti-sweet. However, its anti-sweet activity is less effective than gymnemic acid 1, another anti-sweet compound glycoside isolated from the leaves of Gymnema sylvestre (Asclepiadaceae).

Ziziphin reduces perceived sweetness of most of the carbohydrates (e.g. glucose, fructose), bulk sweeteners, intense sweeteners (natural: steviol glycoside – artificial: sodium saccharin and aspartame) and sweet amino acids (e.g. glycine). However, it has no effect on the perception of the other tastes, bitterness, sourness and saltiness.

== See also ==
- Hodulcine
- Lactisole
- Gymnemic acid
