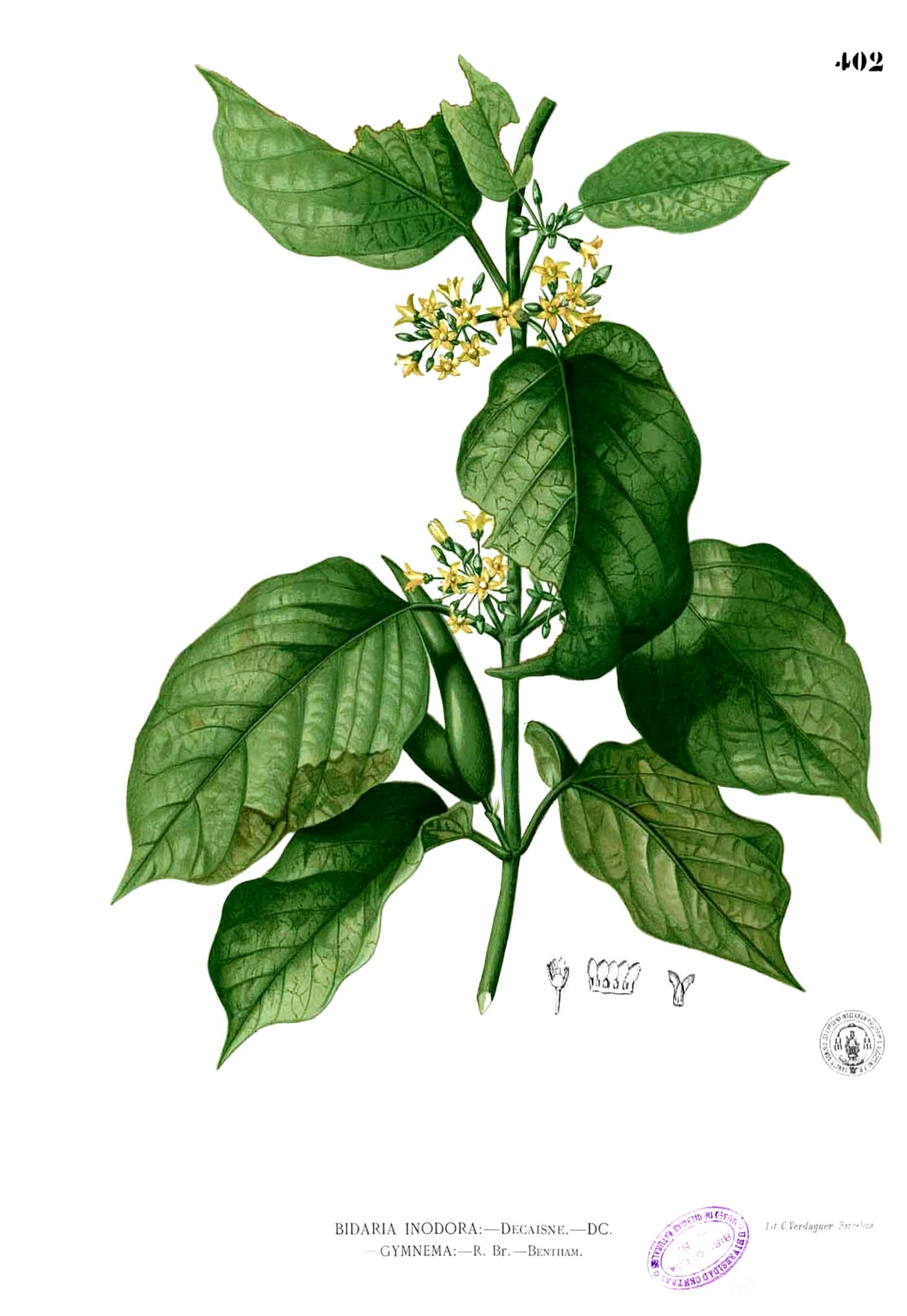
- Gymnema inodorum

Scientific classification
- Kingdom: Plantae
- Clade: Tracheophytes
- Clade: Angiosperms
- Clade: Eudicots
- Clade: Asterids
- Order: Gentianales
- Family: Apocynaceae
- Subfamily: Asclepiadoideae
- Tribe: Marsdenieae
- Genus: Gymnema; R.Br., Prodr. 461–462, March 1810, not R.Br. On the Asclepiadeae 22. April 1810

Synonyms
- Apocynum L.; Bidaria (Endl.) Decne.

= Gymnema =

Genus of plants

Gymnema (Neo-Latin, from Greek γυμνὀς gymnos, "naked" and νῆμα, nēma, "thread") is a genus in the family Apocynaceae first described as a genus in 1810.

One species, Gymnema sylvestre, is commonly used as a dietary supplement and has the ability to suppress the taste of sweetness.

Species

1. Gymnema acuminatum Nepal, N India, W Malaysia
2. Gymnema albidum – Timor
3. Gymnema albiflorum – N Vietnam
4. Gymnema brevifolium – Australia
5. Gymnema calycinum – Luzon I
6. Gymnema chalmersii – New Guinea
7. Gymnema cumingii – Philippines
8. Gymnema cuspidatum
9. Gymnema decaisneanum – Tamil Nadu
10. Gymnema dissitiflorum – W Malaysia
11. Gymnema dunnii – Australia
12. Gymnema elegans – Tamil Nadu
13. Gymnema erianthum – New Caledonia
14. Gymnema foetidum – Yunnan
15. Gymnema glabrum – Myanmar
16. Gymnema griffithii – Thailand
17. Gymnema hainanense – Hainan
18. Gymnema hirtum – W Malaysia
19. Gymnema inodorum – S China, India, SE Asia
20. Gymnema javanicum – Java
21. Gymnema khandalense – Maharashtra
22. Gymnema lacei – Myanmar, Bangladesh
23. Gymnema lactiferum – India, Sri Lanka
24. Gymnema latifolium – S China, India, Nepal, N Indochina
25. Gymnema littorale – Java
26. Gymnema longiretinaculatum – S China
27. Gymnema lushaiense – Assam
28. Gymnema macrothyrsa – Sulawesi
29. Gymnema maingayi – Malacca
30. Gymnema mariae – Philippines
31. Gymnema micradenium – Queensland
32. Gymnema molle – Myanmar
33. Gymnema montanum – India
34. Gymnema muelleri – Northern Terr of Australia
35. Gymnema pachyglossum – Luzon I
36. Gymnema piperi – Mindanao
37. Gymnema pleiadenium – Queensland
38. Gymnema recurvifolium – New Guinea
39. Gymnema rotundatum – Sri Lanka
40. Gymnema rufescens – Madagascar
41. Gymnema schlechterianum – Philippines
42. Gymnema spirei – Laos
43. Gymnema suborbiculare – New Guinea
44. Gymnema sylvestre – S China, Ryukyu Is, SE Asia, India, Sri Lanka, Africa
45. Gymnema syringaefolium – Timor
46. Gymnema thorelii – Laos
47. Gymnema tricholepis – New Guinea
48. Gymnema trinerve – Australia
49. Gymnema uncarioides – Luzon I
50. Gymnema yunnanense – Guangxi, Yunnan

formerly included

1. Gymnema columnare, syn of Gongronema nepalense
2. Gymnema crenatum, syn of Loeseneriella crenata
3. Gymnema finlaysonii, syn of Gongronema finlaysonii
4. Gymnema longepedunculatum, syn of Tylophora longipedunculata
5. Gymnema macrocarpum, syn of Dregea schimperi
6. Gymnema nepalense, syn of Gongronema nepalense
7. Gymnema nitidum, syn of Salacia nitida
8. Gymnema reticulatum, syn of Hoya reticulata
9. Gymnema sagittatum, syn of Gongronema nepalense
10. Gymnema subnudum, syn of Sarcolobus subnudus
11. Gymnema tenacissimum, syn of Marsdenia tenacissima
12. Gymnema thomsonii, syn of Gongronema thomsonii
13. Gymnema wallichii, syn of Gongronema wallichii
