= Hodulcine =

Chemical structure of hoduloside I

Hodulcines (or hodulosides) are a group of glycosides of dammarane-type triterpenes which are isolated from the leaves of Hovenia dulcis Thunb. (Rhamnaceae), also known as Japanese raisin tree. Several glycoside homologs have been found in this plant, including hoduloside I, which exhibits anti-sweet activity, but is less potent than gymnemic acid 1.

== See also ==
- Gymnemic acid
- Lactisole
- Ziziphin
