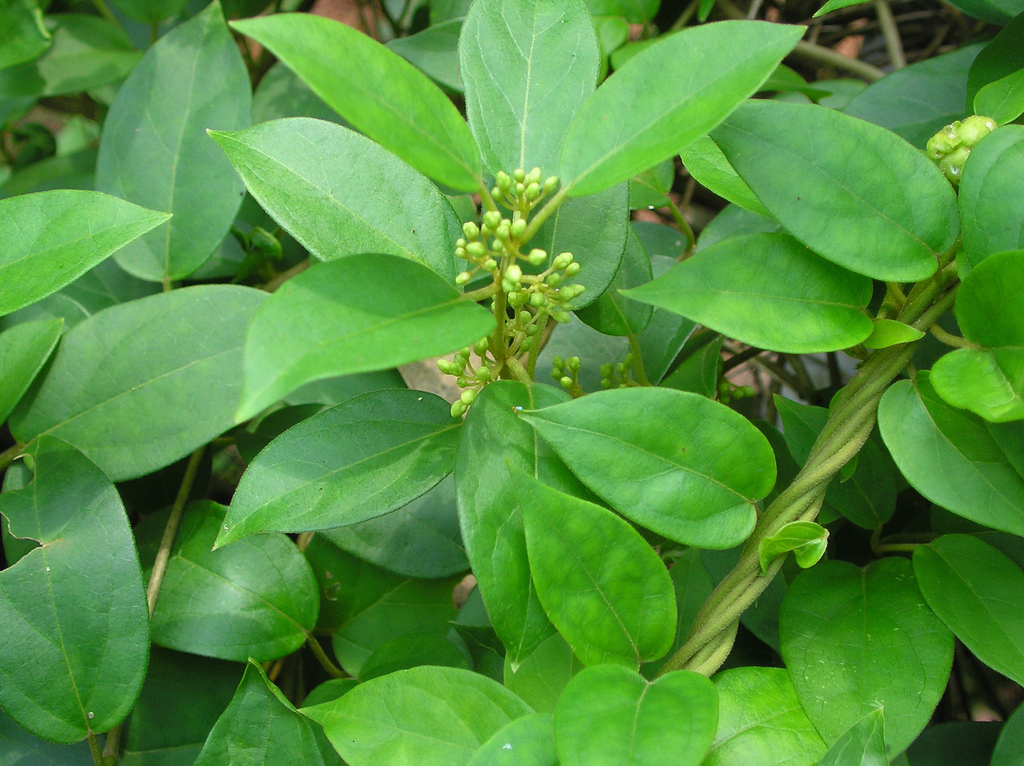
- Gymnema sylvestre, at Eastern Ghats, India

Scientific classification
- Kingdom: Plantae
- Clade: Embryophytes
- Clade: Tracheophytes
- Clade: Spermatophytes
- Clade: Angiosperms
- Clade: Eudicots
- Clade: Asterids
- Order: Gentianales
- Family: Apocynaceae
- Genus: Gymnema
- Species: G. sylvestre

Binomial name
- Gymnema sylvestre R. Br.

= Gymnema sylvestre =

Species of flowering plant

Gymnema sylvestre is a perennial woody vine native to Asia (including the Arabian Peninsula), Africa and Australia. It has been used in Ayurvedic medicine. Common names include gymnema, Australian cowplant, and Periploca of the woods, and the Hindi term gurmar Tamil(சிறுகுறிஞ்சான்) Sirukurunjan, which means "sugar destroyer"

The leaves and extracts contain gymnemic acids, the major bioactive constituents that interact with taste receptors on the tongue to temporarily suppress the taste of sweetness.

== Description ==
The plant is a climber with leaves having soft hairs on the upper surface. The leaves are elongated-oval in shape. It has a small, yellow, umbelliferous inflorescence that is produced throughout the year.

== Properties ==
Gymnema sylvestre has a long history of use in herbal medicine and a broad range of therapeutic properties.

=== Blocks sweet taste sensations ===
Its leaves contain triterpenoid saponins, flavonols, and gurmarin. The major biologically active plant molecules are gymnemic acids, a class of triterpenoid saponins, which have the effect of suppressing the taste of sweetness on the tongue from sucrose (sugar), stevia, xylitol, and artificial sweeteners such as aspartame.

The sweet-blocking effect of G. sylvestre lasts from 15 to 50 minutes and may even persist for several hours. Gymnemic acids apparently have no long-term effects on taste and they do not influence bitter, salty, or sour taste perception.

=== Effects on sugar absorption and insulin secretion ===
Gymnemic acid compounds in Gymnema sylvestre can also attach to receptors on the intestinal walls, helping to reduce absorption of sugar molecules in the gut. This process can lower blood sugar and promote insulin secretion and release. However, its antidiabetic properties were not confirmed in rats.

== Uses ==
1. Reduction of sugar intake: G. sylvestre extracts taken in the form of lozenges, mouthwash, or tea diminishes the consumption of sweet foods and overall caloric intake. Extracts (formulated as a mint lozenge) reduced the desire for high-sugar foods and the pleasant taste of candy. Research also suggests that Gymnema sylvestre extracts reduce cravings for sugar. In a double-blind study, participants who received a gymnemic acid lozenge declined candy (before tasting it) more often than the placebo group.
2. Weight loss: In Japan, 50 tons of G. sylvestre leaves are consumed annually for the purpose of weight loss. Early research suggests that taking a specific combination of Gymnema sylvestre extract, hydroxycitric acid, and niacin-bound chromium by mouth for 8 weeks might reduce body weight in people who are overweight or obese.
3. Traditional uses: In Eastern and Ayurvedic medicine, G. sylvestre leaves and extracts have been used to treat eye diseases, allergies, constipation, cough, dental caries, obesity, stomach ailments, and viral infections. G. sylvestre has also been used as an antioxidant, antimicrobial, and aphrodisiac.

== Etymology ==
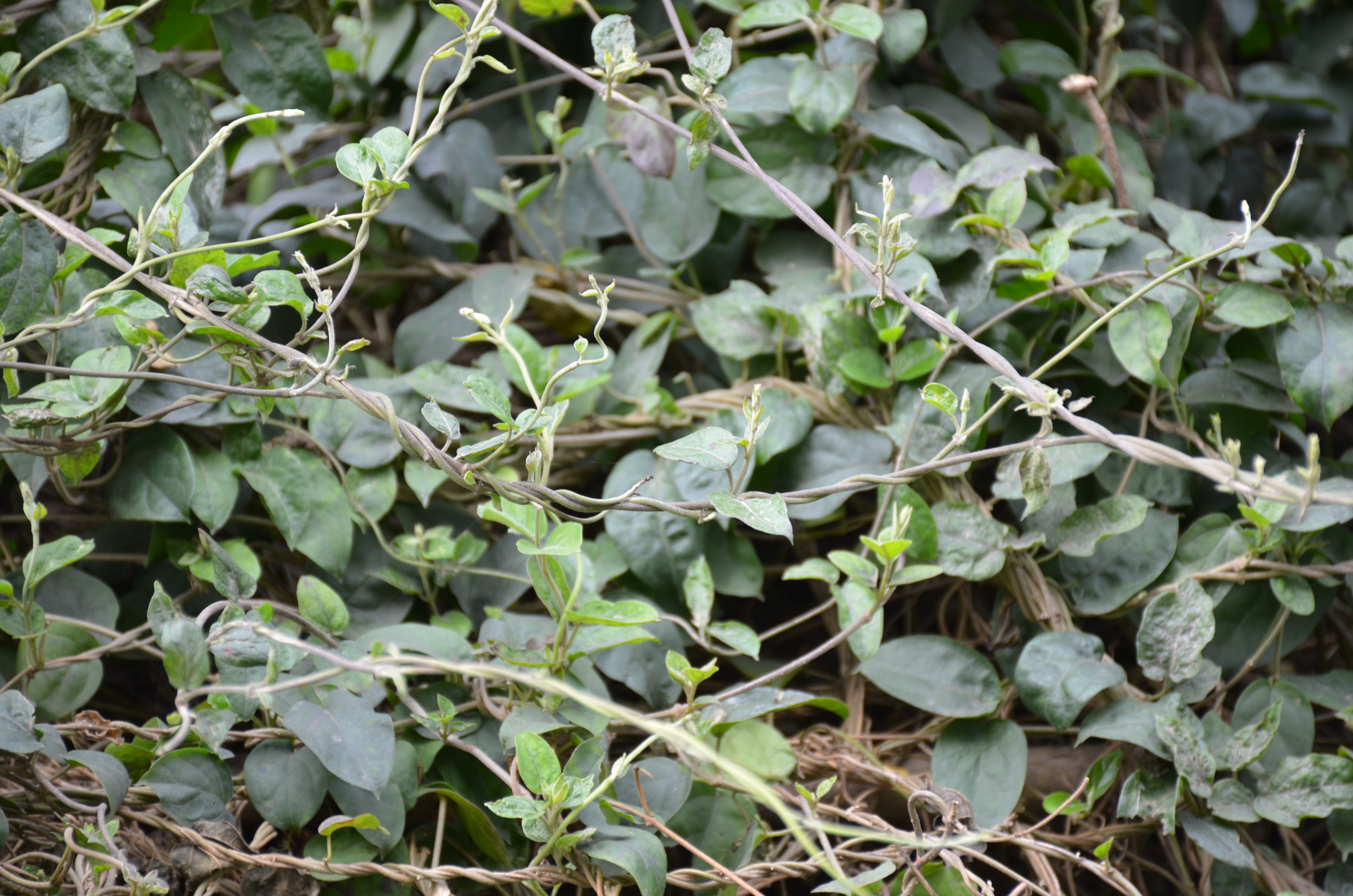
G. sylvestre

Gymnema derives from the Greek words gymnos (γυμνὀς) and nēma (νῆμα) meaning "naked" and "thread", respectively; the species epitheton sylvestre means "of the forest" in Latin.

The Hindi and Urdu name gurmar, Sanskrit मधुनाशिनी (madhunashini), Malayalam chakkarakolli, Tamil சிறுகுறிஞ்சான், and Telugu పొడపత్రి (podapatri), all literally mean "sugar destroyer". (Sanskrit) meshashringi translates as "ram's horn", a name given to the plant due to the shape of its fruits.
