= Drug abuse retinopathy =

Effect of chronic drug abuse

Drug abuse retinopathy is damage to the retina of the eyes caused by chronic drug abuse. Types of retinopathy caused by drug abuse include maculopathy, Saturday night retinopathy, and talc retinopathy. Common symptoms include temporary and permanent vision loss, blurred vision, and night blindness. Substances commonly associated with this condition include poppers, heroin, cocaine, methamphetamine, tobacco, and alcohol.

== Retinopathy ==
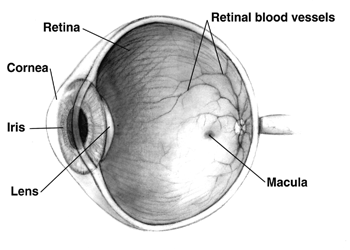
The position of the retina, its vasculature, and the macula.

Retina is the innermost layer of the eye. It is made up of three layers, namely the outer pigmented layer, the middle photoreceptor layer and the inner neural layer. The pigmented layer absorbs light that penetrates the inner neural layer. The photoreceptor layer consists of 2 kinds of photoreceptor cells, rod cells and cone cells. Rod cells have high sensitivity to light. Hence, they are responsible for night vision, but they cannot differentiate between colors, meaning that they only have black and white vision. Cone cells have low sensitivity to light, but they have the ability to differentiate between colors. These photoreceptor cells are unevenly distributed throughout the retina. The density of rod cells increases peripherally, and the cone cells are concentrated in a region called macula with no rod cells. This region is responsible for high-resolution and color vision.

=== Maculopathy ===
Maculopathy is an eye disease that refers to the breakdown of the macula. Macula is the region on the retina containing the highest concentration of cone cells which is responsible for color vision. Symptoms of maculopathy include a reduction in central vision acuity, distorted vision, and perceived flashes of light that occur without an actual light source.

=== Saturday night retinopathy ===
Saturday night retinopathy is a condition that is due to central retinal or ophthalmic artery occlusion. Common clinical features include ophthalmoplegia and orbital congestion. The etiology of this condition is related to unconsciousness after drug use, leading to patient sleeping in an unusual position that continuously exerts pressure on the orbit. This orbital compression will result in ophthalmic and central retinal artery occlusion which lead to ischemia in the inner retina and the patient may experience sudden unilateral blindness and eye pain.

=== Talc retinopathy ===
Talc is a filler commonly added in tablet formulation acting as a glidant to improve the flowability of the drug powder. It is also frequently added as an adulterant in illicit drugs such as heroin and methamphetamine to increase its volume and weight and thus its street value. When it is inhaled, it will enter the systemic circulation through the capillaries in the nasal mucosa. After entering the systemic circulation, it will deposit in the retinal blood vessels and undergo reaction which lead to focal narrowing of retinal vessels. This significantly reduces the blood flow to retina and eventually lead to retinal ischemia. Clinical features include refractile yellow deposit seen under fundoscopy. Patients may experience reduced visual field and acuity.

== Disease causing agents ==
=== Alkyl nitrites (poppers) ===
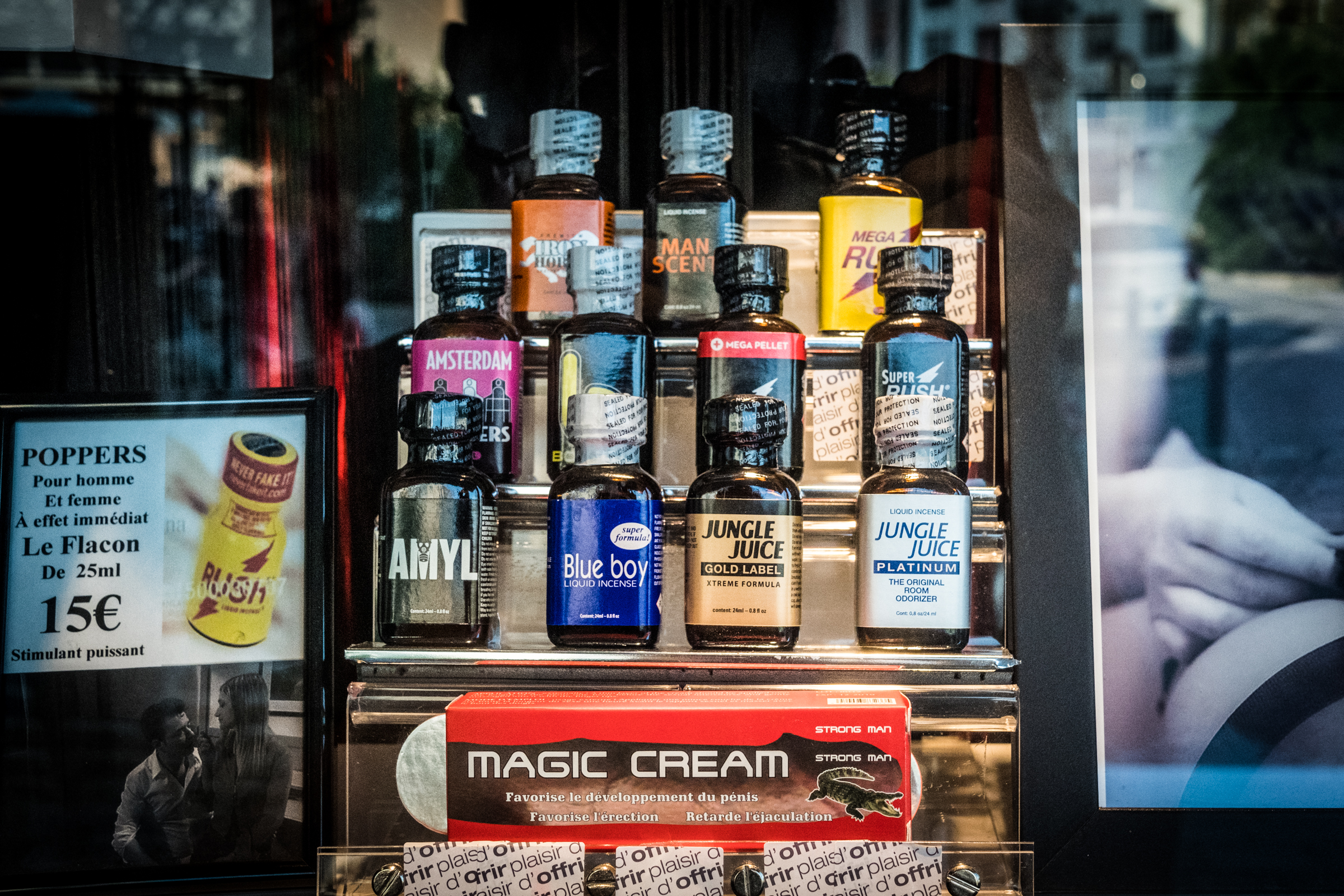
Bottles of poppers on sale in a shop.

Poppers is an inhaled drug which contains a range of alkyl nitrites, such as isobutyl nitrite and amyl nitrite. Despite its primary usage as a potent vasodilator, its popularity among the homosexual community largely stems from its ability to facilitate anal sexual intercourse by relaxing the smooth muscles in the internal anal sphincter. The use of intranasal poppers is associated with the development of macular degeneration through a poorly known mechanism. This condition may be the consequence of the increase in nitric oxide (NO) level following the oxidation of alkyl nitrites. The increase in NO level exerts a more significant stimulatory effect on guanylate cyclase, an enzyme found in cone cells. Upon activation, guanylate cyclase converts more guanosine triphosphate (GTP) to cyclic guanosine monophosphate (cGMP). cGMP is involved in the photo-transduction pathway which allows calcium and sodium to enter and depolarize the cell. A high level of cGMP results in high calcium levels in the cells. The increase in intracellular cGMP and calcium level results in the production of reactive oxygen species (ROS), which damage macular cone cells and leads to macular degeneration.

=== Heroin ===
The chemical structure of heroin.

Heroin is an opioid with a rapid onset of action after intravenously administration. Once being injected, it binds to the Mu receptors in the central nervous system within 15–20 seconds. Users feel a sense of euphoria shortly after application, making it a highly addictive drug. The use of intravenous heroin is associated with the development of Saturday Night retinopathy. Currently, no specific treatment is deemed effective in treating Saturday Night retinopathy as the ischemic injury caused by prolonged compression by external forces is irreversibly dealt to the retinal vasculature. In the case of a high intraocular pressure, an anterior chamber paracentesis or a lateral canthotomy can be considered if standard treatments have failed. Other symptoms, such as proptosis, enlargement of the extraocular muscles, and eye pain seem to resolve in the absence of intervention. As with other drug-related problems, patients should be evaluated for other heroin-related sequelae and be referred accordingly.

=== Cocaine ===
Cocaine is a central nervous system stimulant that can be used recreationally to produce a euphoric effect. Cocaine is associated with retinal toxicity mainly through its negative impacts on the retinal vasculature. Cocaine use causes increased norepinephrine levels and the resulting sympathetic activation leads to vasospasm and hypertension, both of which are risk factors to retinal blood vessel damage.

Related retinal vasculature conditions include central retinal artery occlusion, central retinal vein occlusion and cilioretinal artery occlusion. The occlusion of retinal blood vessels reduces blood supply to the retina, which causes tissue ischemia. Insufficient blood flow deprives the retina of oxygen, removal of waste metabolites and nutrients. This prevents proper retinal homeostasis and causes tissue injury. Over a long period, tissue damage accumulates and leads to tissue death or retinal infarction. The duration of cocaine use is a major contributing factor to the severity of the adverse retinal effect.

Cocaine use is also associated with retinal hemorrhage due to the general increase in blood pressure and blood vessel occlusion within the retina. Signs and symptoms of retinal hemorrhage include painless unilateral floaters, seeing a red hue, cobwebs, haze, shadows, and visual loss. More advanced retinal hemorrhage may limit visual acuity and fields and may lead to the formation of a blind spot. Vision is often poorer in the morning. Treatments of retinal hemorrhage include cryotherapy and laser therapy.

=== Methamphetamine ===
Methamphetamine is a highly addictive stimulant that stimulates the release of dopamine in the brain. The common manufacturing process of methamphetamine includes the reduction of over-the-counter nasal decongestant such as pseudoephedrine which contains talc as filler. Therefore, intranasal or intravenous use of methamphetamine is associated with talc retinopathy. There is no treatment for talc retinopathy but cessation of methamphetamine plays a role in preventing further reduction in visual field and acuity.

=== Tobacco ===
Nicotine is a highly addictive substance found in tobacco products such as cigarettes, cigars, and chewing tobacco. When nicotine is inhaled or consumed, it enters the bloodstream and damages the blood vessels the eyes. Common symptoms include blurred vision, dark spots in the vision, and even blindness in severe cases. The exact mechanisms nicotine causes retinopathy are not fully understood. However, it is believed that nicotine can cause oxidative stress and inflammation, leading to ocular vascular damage. Additionally, nicotine can cause constriction of the blood vessels, reducing blood flow to the eyes and making them more vulnerable to damage and disease. It is recommended that smokers exhibiting signs and symptoms of retinopathy engage in smoking cessation to improve their quality of life.

=== Alcohol ===
Heavy alcohol use is associated with higher blood pressure levels. The consumption of alcohol leads to the release of renin, an enzyme that aids in the activation of a hormone called angiotensin II. This hormone causes blood vessels to constrict and increases blood pressure. This relationship is particularly pronounced in people with diabetes. Elevated blood pressure can damage the delicate blood vessels in the eye and lead to retinopathy.

The hepatic metabolism of excess alcohol leads to an increase in the level of endogenous toxins, such as methanol, which is often present in homemade alcohol This causes swelling of the eye and optic nerve and damage to the retina, especially in people who have underlying liver disease or who are already at risk for retinopathy due to diabetes. Alcohol-induced liver disease can also exacerbate other health conditions that contribute to retinopathy, such as hypertension and hyperglycemia.

Metabolic pathway of vitamin A.

Alcohol consumption leads to abnormalities in the metabolism pathways of several essential nutrients for eye health such as vitamin A and zinc. Alcohol undergoes oxidative metabolism in the liver and is converted to acetaldehyde, then to acetic acid. Retinol, the form of vitamin A in food and dietary supplements, is oxidatively metabolized following a similar pathway, being converted to retinal and retinoic acid, the active form of vitamin A. Excessive alcohol consumption places a heavy burden on the enzymes catalyzing these reactions and leads to poor vitamin A homeostasis. Besides, alcohol mediates the modulation of zinc transporters and leads to a decrease in levels of zinc in the body. This results in retinopathic symptoms such as nyctalopia and macular degeneration.
