= Head cleaner =

Head cleaner or headcleaner can refer to:

- Tape head cleaner, a substance or device used for cleaning the record/playback heads of a magnetic tape drive such as in a video or audio tape machine
- Cleaning card, card magnetic stripe magnetic head cleaner
- Poppers, a muscle relaxant commonly used by the LGBTQ+ community
- Headcleaner (album), 1988 album by Lime Spiders
- Headcleaner, 1998 album by I Against I
- "Headcleaner", song from Tabula Rasa, a 1993 album by Einstürzende Neubauten
- Headcleaner, band signed by Network 23
