= C4H9NO2 =

The molecular formula C_{4}H_{9}NO_{2} (molar mass: 103.12 g/mol) may refer to:

- α-Aminobutyric acid
- β-Aminobutyric acid
- γ-Aminobutyric acid (GABA)
- 2-Aminoisobutyric acid
- 3-Aminoisobutyric acid
- Butyl nitrite
- tert-Butyl nitrite
- Dimethylglycine
- Isobutyl nitrite
