= Cyclohexyl nitrite =

Chemical compound

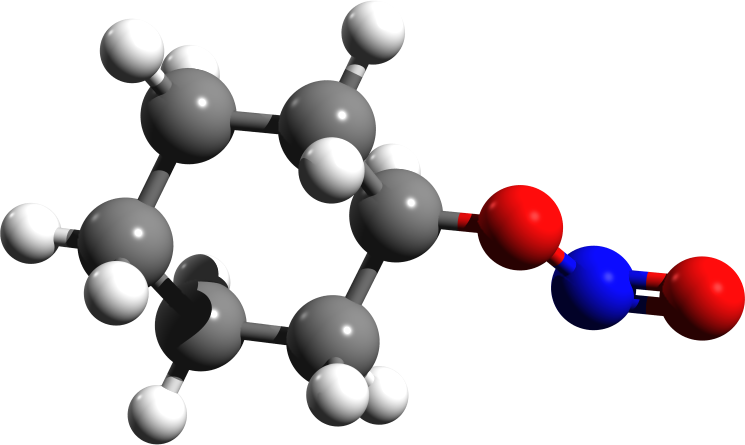

Clinical data
- Other names: Nitrous acid, cyclohexyl ester; N-Cyclohexyl nitrite; Cyclohexyl alcohol nitrite; C-hexyl nitrite; O-Nitrosocyclohexanol
- ATC code: none

Identifiers
- IUPAC name: cyclohexyl nitrite
- CAS Number: 5156-40-1
- PubChem CID: 545140
- ChemSpider: 474493
- UNII: 02XU02QRLX
- CompTox Dashboard (EPA): DTXSID30337856

Chemical and physical data
- Formula: C_{6}H_{11}NO_{2}
- Molar mass: 129.159 g·mol^{−1}
- 3D model (JSmol): Interactive image
- SMILES: O=NOC1CCCCC1
- InChI: InChI=1S/C6H11NO2/c8-7-9-6-4-2-1-3-5-6/h6H,1-5H2; Key:NRCNZCLHYWKEDX-UHFFFAOYSA-N

Cyclohexyl nitrite is an organic compound, with formula C_{6}H_{11}NO_{2}. It is the ester of cyclohexanol and nitrous acid, i.e. it is an alkyl nitrite. Like amyl nitrite and butyl nitrite, it acts as an antianginal due to vasodilation. The compound is colorless, volatile liquid.

== Safety ==
Inhaling the cyclohexyl nitrite vapor can lead to headache and dangerously low blood pressure.

== Recreational use ==
Since early 2020 cyclohexyl nitrite has become popular as a recreational drug called poppers, mostly labeled as Canadian formula in various online stores that offer purchase of the drug. When used as an inhalant the effects are described as - stimulating ejaculation and orgasm, relaxation of sphincter muscles during anal sex, therefore making this compound appealing to the gay community, although users describe the experience as not even close compared to other alkyl nitrites.
