= C6H13NO2 =

The molecular formula C_{6}H_{13}NO_{2} (molar mass: 131.17 g/mol, exact mass: 131.0946 u) may refer to:

- Alloisoleucine
- Aminocaproic acid
- Hexyl nitrite
- Isoleucine
- Leucine
- β-Leucine
- Norleucine
- Thialdine
