= C5H11NO2 =

The molecular formula C_{5}H_{11}NO_{2} may refer to:

The Aminopentanoic acids:

- Valine
- Isovaline
- Norvaline
- 3-Aminopentanoic acid
- 3-Amino-2-methylbutyric acid
- 3-Amino-3-methylbutyric acid
- 3-Amino-2,2-dimethylpropanoic acid
- 3-Amino-2-ethylpropanoic acid
- 4-Aminovaleric acid
- 4-Amino-2-methylbutyric acid
- 3-Methyl-GABA (4-Amino-3-methylbutyric acid)
- 5-Aminovaleric acid

The nitrites:

- Amyl nitrite
- Pentyl nitrite

And other molecules:

- β-Alanine ethyl ester
- N-Methylmorpholine N-oxide
- Trimethylglycine
