= CH3NO2 =

The molecular formula CH_{3}NO_{2} may refer to:

- Carbamic acid, compound with the formula H_{2}NCOOH
- Methyl nitrite, organic compound with the chemical formula CH_{3}ONO
- Nitromethane, organic compound with the chemical formula CH_{3}NO_{2}
