= Hexyl nitrite =

Names
- Other names n-Hexyl nitrite; Nitrous acid, hexyl ester

Identifiers
CAS Number	638-51-7
3D model (JSmol)	Interactive image
Beilstein Reference	1702621
ChemSpider	4895948
EC Number	680-102-5
PubChem CID	6365123
CompTox Dashboard (EPA)	DTXSID70213246
- InChI: InChI=1S/C6H13NO2/c1-2-3-4-5-6-9-7-8/h2-6H2,1H3 Key: SGRWGISGVDVSJV-UHFFFAOYSA-N
- SMILES: CCCCCCON=O

Properties
Chemical formula	C_{6}H_{13}NO_{2}
Molar mass	131.175 g·mol^{−1}

Hazards
- GHS labelling
Pictograms	(GHS02: Flammable) (GHS07: Exclamation mark)
Signal word	Danger
Hazard statements	H225, H302, H312, H332
Precautionary statements	P210, P233, P240, P241, P242, P243, P261, P264, P270, P271, P280, P301+P317, P302+P352, P303+P361+P353, P304+P340, P317, P321, P330, P362+P364, P370+P378, P403+P235, P501
- Except where otherwise noted, data are given for materials in their standard state (at 25 °C [77 °F], 100 kPa). Infobox references

Hexyl nitrite has the formula C_{6}H_{13}NO_{2} and is a nitrite and more specifically, an alkyl nitrite. It is an ester of hexanol and nitrous acid. It has the structural formula of: CH_{3}(CH_{2})_{5}ONO The CAS Registry Number is 638-51-7 and the European Community number 680-102-5. It is REACH and TSCA registered. It is also known as nitrous acid, hexyl ester. It is the aliphatic analogue of cyclohexyl nitrite.

== Applications ==
Hexyl nitrite is one of the compounds used as poppers, an inhalant drug that induces a brief euphoria. It, along with other hexyl nitrites, was investigated in the 1930s for angiospastic conditions. It has subsequently been used in treatment of various cardiovascular conditions. Its most popular use though is as a stimulant particularly popular in the gay community as a sex aid.

== Physiological effects ==
Hexyl nitrite like other alkyl nitrites, is a vasodilator resulting in the expansion of blood vessels, thus lowering blood pressure. Side effects can be headaches, flushing, heart rate increase, dizziness, and relaxation of involuntary muscles, such as the internal and external anal sphincter. Overdoses can cause nausea and fainting. It is extremely fast reacting, usually a few seconds, but the effects disappear after a few minutes.

== Safety ==
Warnings have been issued by the FDA about its use. Some of the side effects include headaches, dizziness and fainting. As they are extensively used as a recreational stimulant, its use along with other alkyl nitrites has been extensively studied. In particular the potential for methemoglobinization of blood and thus loss of oxygen transport potential. Its possible implication in HIV/AIDS transmission has been discredited.
