= Quinine total synthesis =

Chemical agent and drug construction

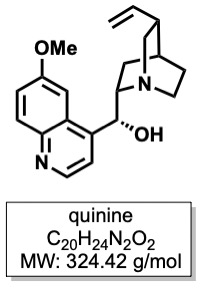
The structure, formula, and molecular weight of quinine.

The total synthesis of quinine details the research and synthetic methods required to produce the alkaloid quinine artificially, the steps of which were developed over the course of a century and a half, beginning with the molecule's formal discovery in 1820 by Pierre Joseph Pelletier and Joseph Caventou.

Quinine, an alkaloid isolated from the bark of the cinchona, a tree native to South America, has been historically used as a medication to treat malaria as well as babesiosis. In addition to its antimalarial properties, quinine is also commonly found in tonic water, and is responsible for the bitter taste.

Although the total synthesis of quinine has been accomplished a number of times, it has never been produced on an industrial scale as a substitute for the naturally-occurring alkaloid. Nevertheless, the total synthesis of quinine is regarded as a milestone in organic chemistry, ushering in a new era of organic synthesis with a purpose outside of structure elucidation.

== The structure of quinine ==
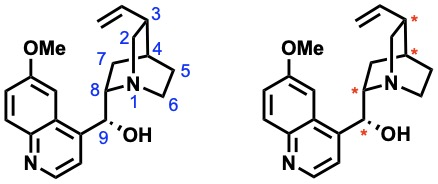
The typical numbering convention of quinine on left, the stereocenters on right.

Quinine is a fairly simple natural product, a chiral molecule containing four stereocenters within the quinuclidine bicyclic amine group. With four stereocenters present in the structure, 16 possible stereoisomers of quinine can exist. The correct configuration of these centers (i.e. the correct orientation of these stereocenters and their bonds), is critical to a successful total synthesis.

Other structural features of quinine include an aromatic quinoline system, containing a methoxy group present on the carbon ring. A methylene bridge (C9) connects the quinuclidine amine and the quinoline system; on this bridge is a hydroxyl group. A vinyl group occupies the C3 position.

== Historical overview of selected syntheses ==
=== Early attempts ===
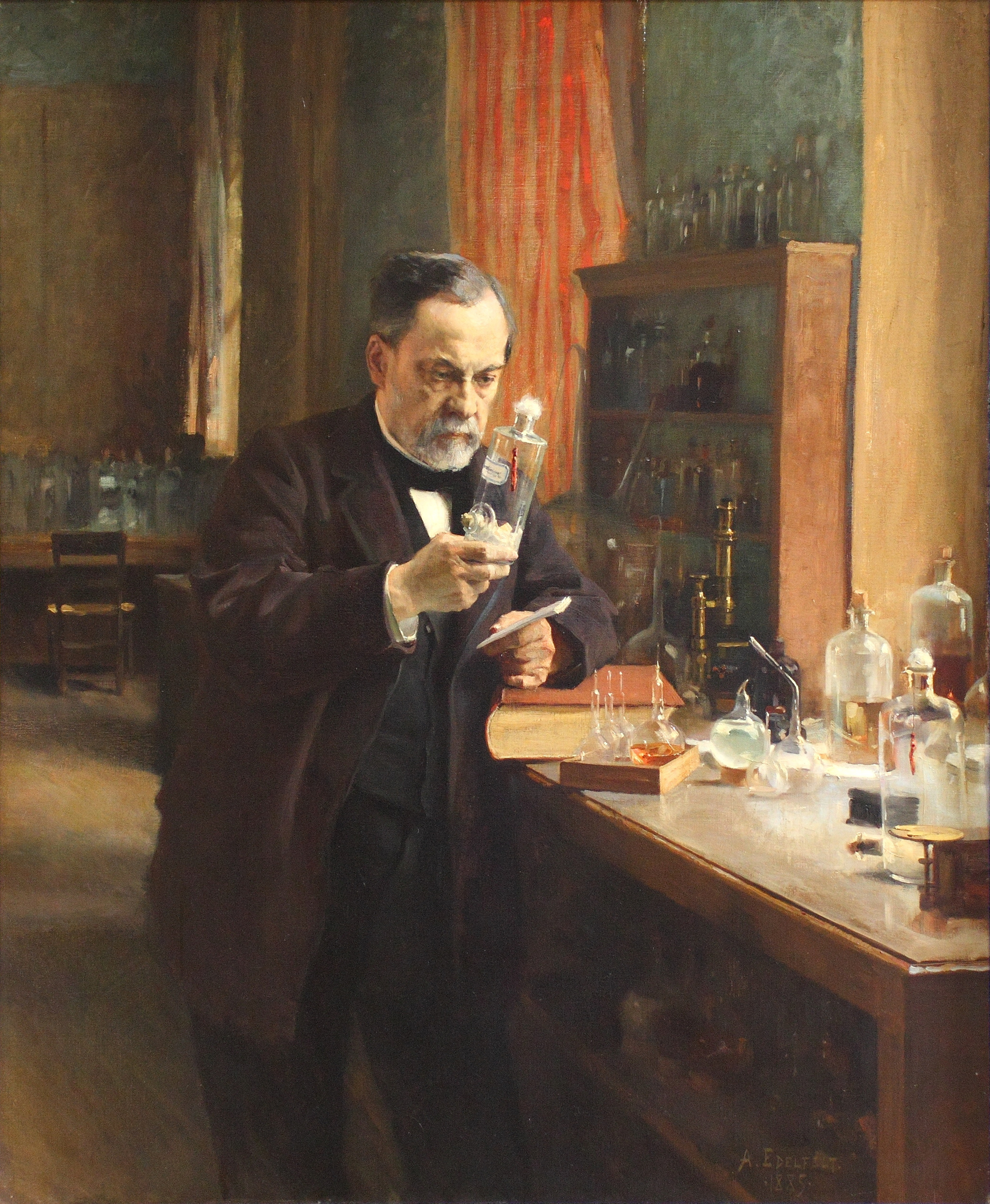
In 1853, Louis Pasteur converted quinine to quinotoxine, a finding that would be important in the total synthesis of quinine.

The synthetic groundwork towards the synthesis of quinine was first laid down in 1853 with French chemist Louis Pasteur. He was able to produce a derivative of quinine (known as quinotoxine) by using an acid-catalyzed isomerization reaction. Around this time, Sir William Henry Perkin attempted a quinine synthesis of his own, by trying to oxidize N-allyltoluidine to the target molecule. Perkin's synthesis had its basis in the molecular formula of his starting material, believing that two equivalents of N-allyltoluidine (formula C_{10}H_{13}N) reacted with three equivalents of atomic oxygen (O) would give one quinine equivalent (formula C_{20}H_{24}N_{2}O_{2}) with water as a byproduct. Although Perkin's assumption turned out to be incorrect, this effort coincidentally led him to discover mauveine, one of the first synthetic dyes.

In 1907, German chemist Paul Rabe was able to determine the correct atom connectivity of quinine. By 1918, Rabe and fellow chemist Karl Kindler were able to reverse Pasteur's isomerization step, and announced in a very brief communication that they had obtained quinine from the quinotoxine derivative. Notably, this chemical transformation would later be the cause of minor controversy in the decades to come.

In 1943, Milhovil Proštenik and Vladimir Prelog published a report in which they prepared quinotoxine by the condensation of an intermediate called homomeroquinene with ethyl quininate. The homomeroquinene was obtained through the degradation of another natural product, the alkaloid cinchonine.

=== Woodward and Doering's synthesis ===
Woodward (pictured) and Doering reported a formal synthesis of quinine in 1944.

In 1944, Harvard chemists Robert Burns Woodward and William von Eggers Doering put forth the first major synthesis of quinine to date, while working as consultants for the Polaroid Corporation. During World War II, this work was celebrated as a possible new source of quinine, with Japan's occupation of Java in 1942 cutting off the United States from the main source of quinine, then the go-to treatment for malaria.

Although Woodward and Doering's work was significant, it constituted a formal synthesis of the alkaloid; the synthesis of a precursor that can then be converted to quinine using previously-known chemistry. Woodward and Doering had in fact, provided a synthetic route to quinotoxine, which they surmised could be converted to quinine using Rabe's method. They did not experimentally verify if Rabe's method indeed could convert quinotoxine to quinine, instead writing that the method was "established".

=== Uskoković–Gutzwiller–Henderson synthesis ===
In 1970, Milan Uskoković, Jürg Gutzwiller, and Thomas Henderson, chemists working for Hoffmann-La Roche, reported a nine-step synthesis of quinine. The first of its kind in nearly four decades, the synthesis was stereocontrolled throughout the production of the first precursor, an intermediate referred to as N-benzoylmeroquinine. Despite this, their synthesis produced a diastereomic mixture of quinine and quinidine. The main difference between the two products being opposite stereochemistry at the C8 and C9 centers, in particular.

=== Stork's synthesis ===
Although synthetic quinine had been accomplished, producing quinine with the correct, natural stereochemistry had yet to be reported. In 2001, Gilbert Stork of Columbia University published the first stereoselective total synthesis of quinine. The primary focus of the synthesis was to address the stereochemistry at the C8 and C9 centers, in light of the results published by Hoffmann-La Roche in 1973.

Stork and co-workers began their synthesis with the stereoselective construction of an intermediate that would eventually be used as the basis for the quinuclidine amine system. The stereochemistry of the C8 center was set in a hydride addition reaction; a prediction of the reaction site ring being in a half-chair configuration with all substituents positioned equatorially turned out to be correct, with hydride addition resulting in the correct stereochemistry at C8. In the final step of Stork's synthesis, oxidation in the presence of sodium hydride set the correct stereochemistry of the C9 center, completing the synthesis and resulting in a quinine product that, by NMR and mass spectrometry analysis, was identical to a commercial sample.

==== Minor controversy ====
In addition to being the first stereoselective total synthesis of the molecule, Stork's work also called into question Woodward and Doering's synthesis, particularly the final conversion from quinotoxine to quinine using Paul Rabe's 1918 method. Stork claimed that this final conversion had not been verified experimentally by Woodward and Doering, nor Rabe himself, aside from a "terse" announcement. At the time, it remained unknown if this particular quinotoxine-to-quinine step was feasible. The minor controversy was eventually laid to rest when Robert Williams and co-workers successfully repeated Woodward's proposed conversion of quinotoxine to quinine in 2007.

=== Maulide's synthesis ===
Another unique pathway towards the synthesis of quinine was put forth by Nuno Maulide and co-workers. In 2018, the Maulide group reported the total synthesis of quinine through a key C–H activation step. Their synthesis began with the quinuclidine system already established, using commercially available 3-aminoquinuclidine as their starting material. The unique C–H activation step functionalized the C3 position, installing a vinyl group through a series of transformations starting from an aryl functional group.

The synthesis was a stereoselective one, producing (–)-quinine in a 5.4% overall yield over the course of ten steps. In addition to the natural product, Maulide and co-workers also synthesized the enantiomer (+)-quinine, as well as two C3-substituted aryl derivatives. The (+)-quinine and related derivatives were screened for antimalarial activity, with the aryl compounds showing enhanced activity compared to the natural product.

== Synthetic pathways of selected syntheses ==
=== Woodward and Doering (1944) ===
The formal synthesis by Woodward and Doering began with the simple building block 3-hydroxybenzaldehyde 1a, which was reacted with the aminoacetal component 1b in a straightforward condensation reaction to give imine 2. Acid-mediated cyclization of 2 produced the 7-hydroxyisoquinoline 3, which Woodward and Doering cited as their starting point towards quinine. A condensation between the reagents formaldehyde, piperidine, and 3 gave intermediate 4, which was then converted to 5 via a base-mediated removal of the piperidine moiety using sodium methoxide in methanol. A hydrogenation reaction completes the first precursor, 7-hydroxy-8-methylisoquinoline 6.

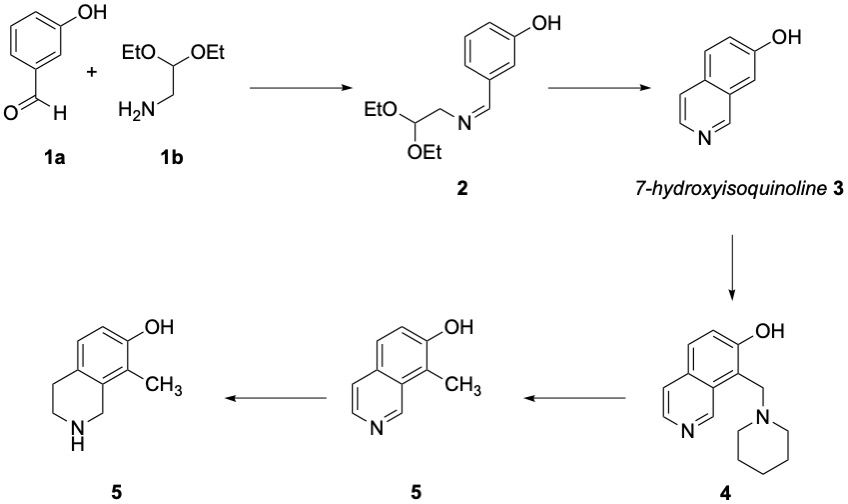

The synthesis continued with the succession of the following steps. With 6 in hand, the free amine is acetyl-protected, and the remaining aromatic ring system is hydrogenated to give tetrahydroisoquinoline 8, which was obtained as the trans isomer via distillation and crystallization. Direct oxidation of 8 gave ketone 9, which was obtained now as the cis isomer from its crystalline hydrate. Reaction of 9 with sodium ethoxide and ethyl nitrite opened the six-membered ring containing the ketone to give intermediate 10. Hydrogenation of the ketoxime group furnished amine 11. Reaction with methyl iodide gave the trimethylammonium salt 12, which was converted free amine 13 though a Hofmann elimination and simultaneous acetyl hydrolysis. Attempts to directly purify amine 13 were unsuccessful, and so reaction with potassium cyanate followed by acidification gave amide 14. This was converted to 15 which was obtained as a colorless oil.

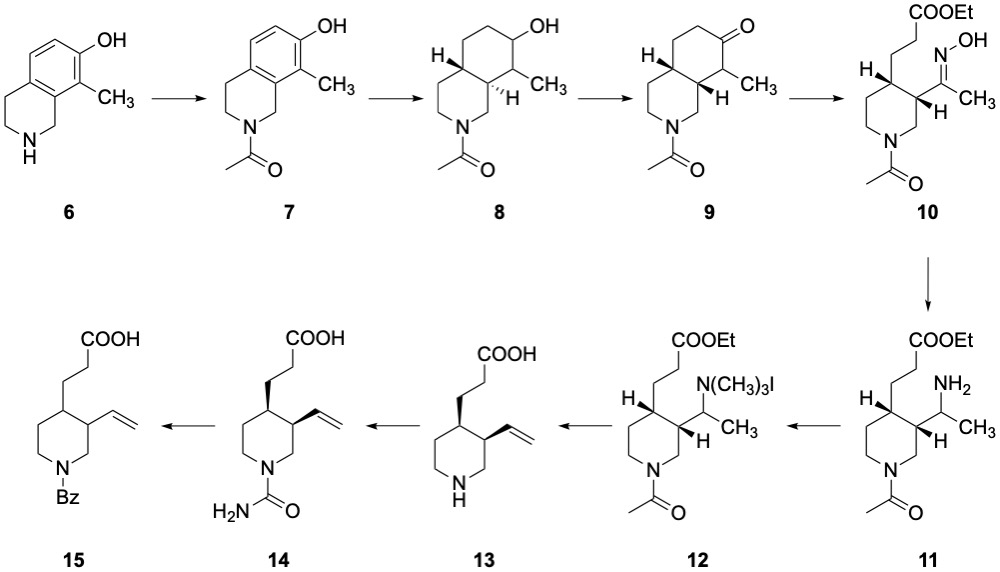

Reaction of 15 with excess ethyl quininate (15a) gave the β-keto ester 16, the result of a condensation reaction between the two. The crude ester 16 was subsequently hydrolyzed to dl-quinotoxine 17. Chiral resolution with dibenzoyl-d-tartaric acid yielded the enantiomerically pure d-quinotoxine-d-tartrate derivative (not pictured). From here, Woodward and Doering considered the work to be complete, citing Rabe's conversion of quinotoxine to quinine as being the final step to reach their synthetic target.

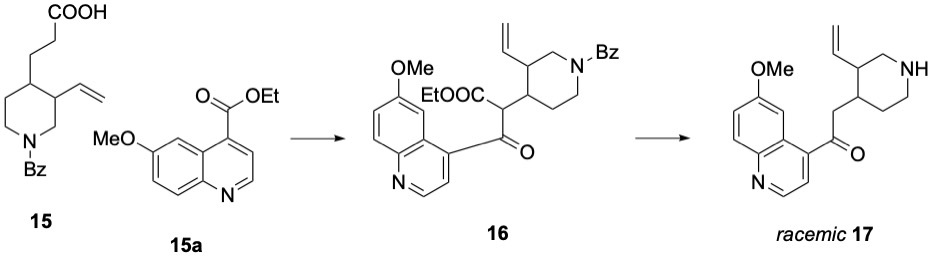

=== Uskokovic and Gutzwiller (1970) ===
The chemists working at Hoffmann-La Roche began their synthetic endeavor with the "easily accessible" N-benzoyl-hexahydroisoquinolone 1. Schmidt reaction of the starting material gave lactam 2 and its related compound 2a. Hydrogenation of the alkene in 2 using rhodium on alumina gave cis-lactam 3. This intermediate was reacted with dinitrogen tetroxide to give N-nitrosolactam 4. Heating of this unstable intermediate led to an intramolecular rearrangement, forming compound 5, which upon further heating expelled molecular nitrogen, giving lactone 5a and carboxylic acid N-benzoylmeroquinene 6. As reported by Uskokovic and co-workers, lactone 5a could be converted to the desired 6 over the course of four additional steps.

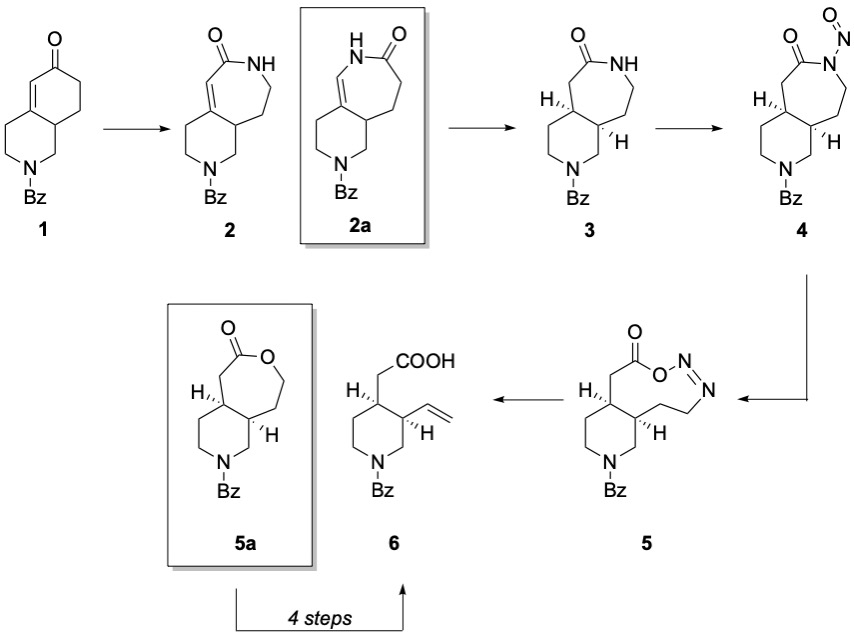

In the next half of the synthesis, carboxylic acid 6 was converted to the methyl ester 7. This was directly coupled to 6-methoxylepidyllithium compound 7a to give N-benzoyl ketone 8.

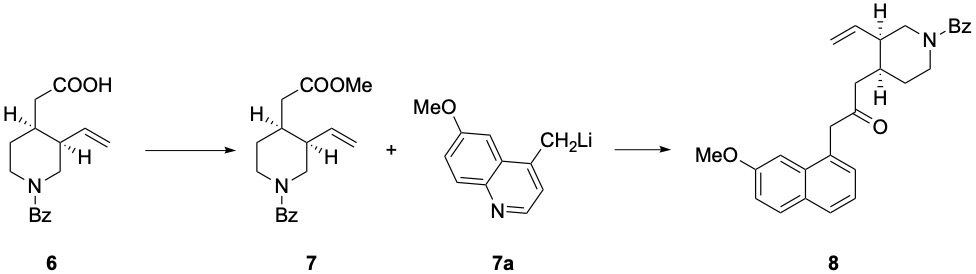

Ketone 8 was isolated as a racemic mixture, which was reacted using DIBAL to cleave the N-benzoyl group which was accompanied by simultaneous reduction of the ketone group. This reaction gave racemic amino-alcohol 9 as a 3:2 mixture of C8 epimers. Chiral resolution was needed at this step in order to obtain the isomer with the correct 3(R), 4(S) configuration. With the correct configuration, amino-alcohol 9 was acetylated at the epimeric C8 alcohol to give 10. Subsequent cyclization in refluxing benzene, acetic acid, and sodium acetate yielded compound 11. In the final step of the sequence, base-catalyzed hydroxylation gave quinine 12 and quinidine 13.

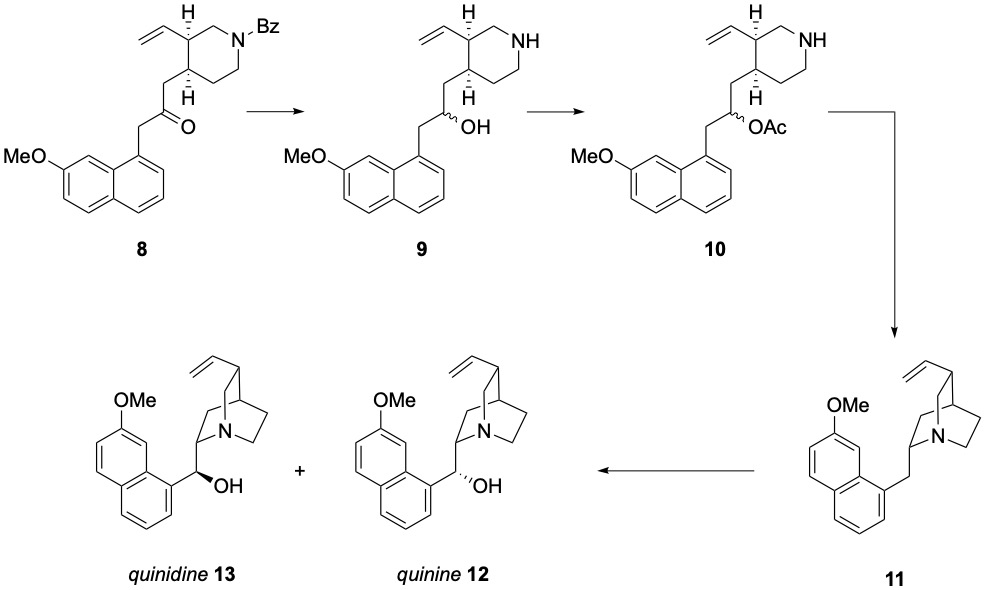

An alternative route to the quinine target was also reported, starting from 4. Compound 8 was epoxidized at the ketone group to give N-benzoyl epoxide 8a. At this juncture, the benzoyl group was cleaved from the amine using DIBAL in toluene to give amino-epoxide 8b as a mixture of diastereomers. The mixture of amino-epoxides were then treated with a 19:1 mixture of toluene and ethanol under reflux to give quinine 12 and quinidine 13 along with epiquinidine (not shown).

==== Alternate route to quinine ====
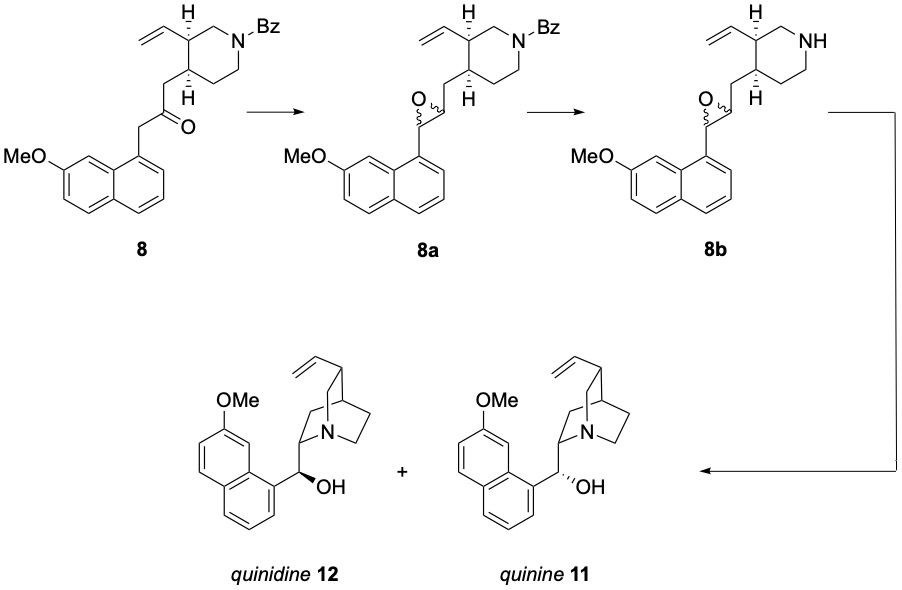

=== Stork and co-workers (2001) ===
The Stork group began their synthesis from the chiral starting material (S)-4-vinylbutyrolactone 1. The particular compound is obtained through chiral resolution. In the subsequent steps all stereogenic centers are put in place through asymmetric induction, meaning that the stereochemistry of this starting material dictates the preferential formation of the natural configuration; the remainder of the synthesis does not contain asymmetric steps.

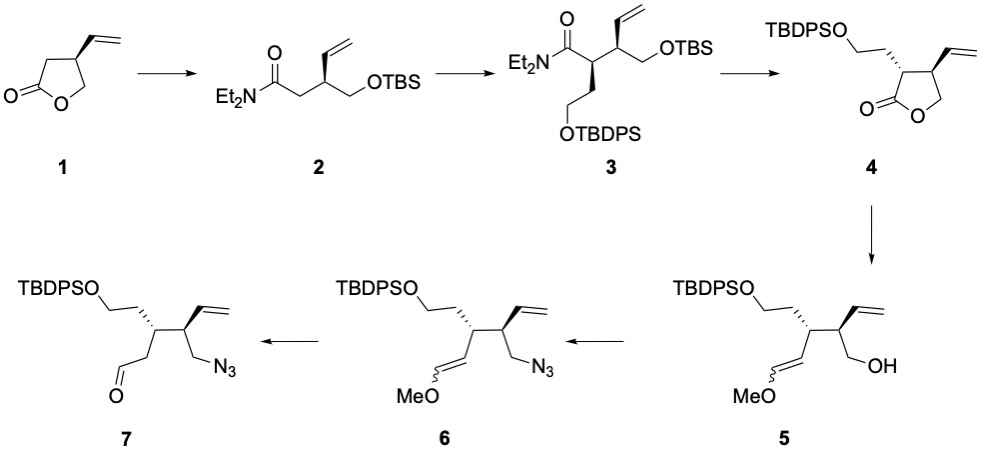

The lactone ring is opened using diethylamine to form amide 2, and the resulting hydroxyl group is protected as a tert-butyldimethyl silyl ether (TBS) in this step as well. The C5 and C6 atoms are added as tert-butyldiphenylsilyl (TBDPS) protected iodoethanol in a nucleophilic substitution of acidic C4 with lithium diisopropylamide (LDA) at −78°C to give compound 3 with correct stereochemistry. The selective removal of the TBS-protecting group in 3 allows for the lactone to re-cyclize, producing 4. This lactone is reduced using DIBAL to form the corresponding lactol, the ring of which can open up on its own to the hydroxy-aldehyde; the aldehyde component is then reacted in a Wittig reaction to give intermediate 5. The primary hydroxyl group is then converted to an azido group to produce azide 6, which is then subjected to an aqueous acid hydrolysis to form azido-aldehyde 7.

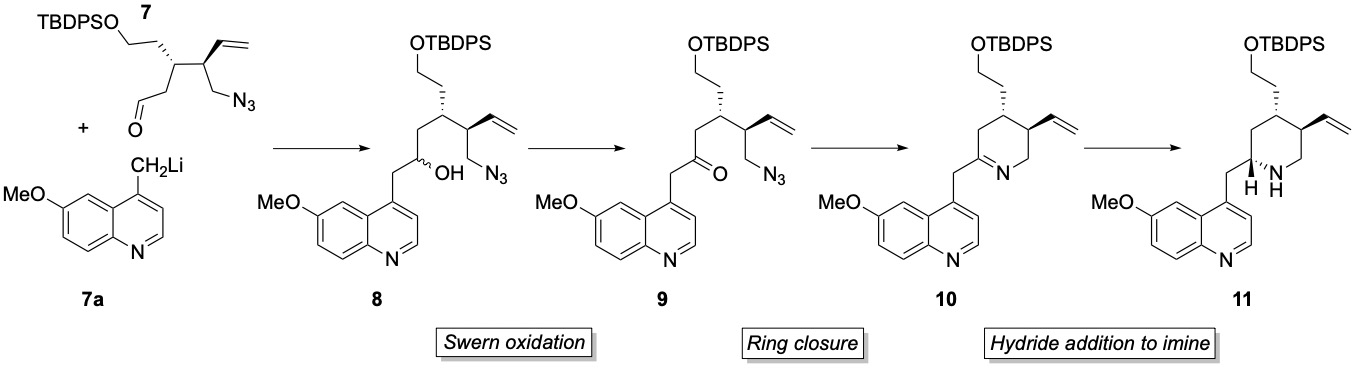

The methyl group in 6-methoxy-4-methylquinoline 7a is sufficiently acidic for reaction with lithium diisopropylamide to form the nucleophilic anion that can add at the aldehyde carbonyl position to give compound 8. The hydroxyl group that results at the C8 position was formed as a mixture of epimers, separation of which was irrelevant as compound 8 was subjected to a Swern oxidation to give ketone 9. A Staudinger reaction with triphenylphosphine closes the ring between the ketone and the azide to the tetrahydropyridine 10. Hydride addition at the C9 position successfully reduced the imine moiety to obtain amine 11, with the correct stereochemistry set into place.

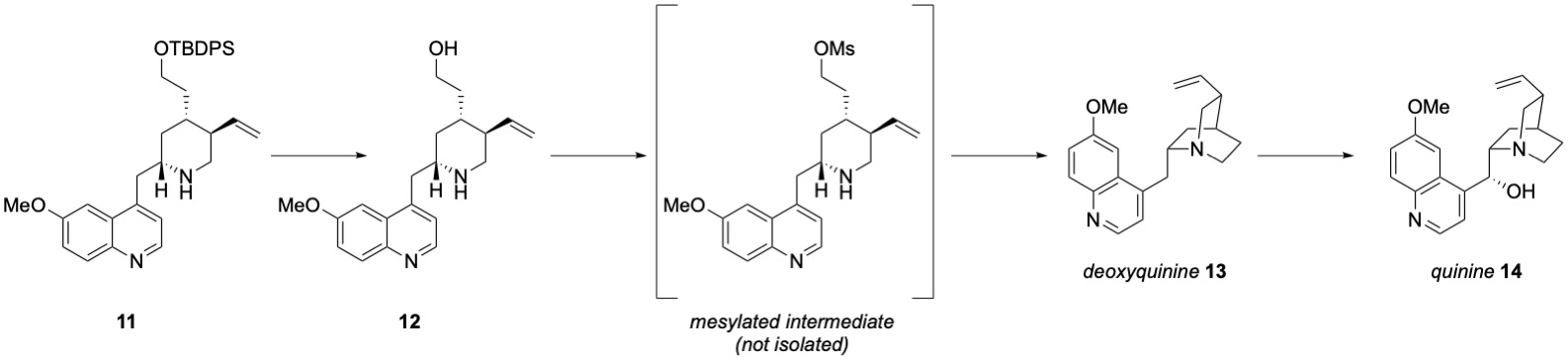

In the final stages of the synthesis, the silyl protecting group in 11 is removed to give primary alcohol 12. This hydroxyl group is then mesylated, and the mesyl intermediate is refluxed in acetonitrile to give deoxyquinine 13. Final oxidation at the C9 center using oxygen in the presence of dimethyl sulfoxide and sodium hydride, produces the synthetic quinine 14 (in an approximately 14:1 ratio compared to C9 epimer epiquinine), completing the synthesis.

=== Maulide and co-workers (2018) ===
In 2018, Maulide and co-workers reported a novel synthesis of quinine featuring a key step of the C8–C9 bond being formed through an aldol addition reaction. The synthesis begins with commercially available 3-aminoquinuclidine 1, which was then reacted with picolinic acid to give picolinamide 2. The picolinamide group was chosen as a suitable directing group for the later aldol addition step, along with being easily removed when needed in further steps. Arylation at C3 gave intermediate 3, with the correct direction of optical rotation matching that of the natural product [(–)-3]. Ruthenium-catalyzed degradation of the aryl group yielded carboxylic acid 4, isolated as the zwitterion.

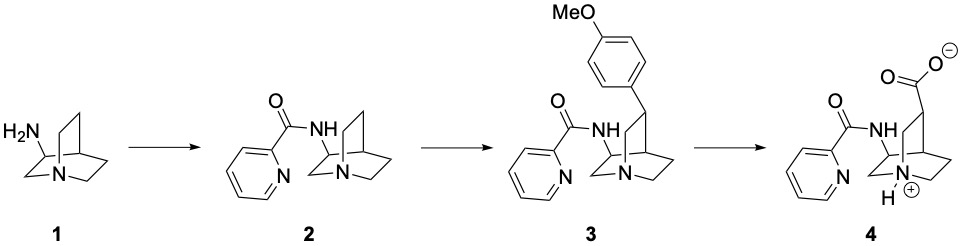

Zwitterion 4 was then converted to Weinreb amide 5 through an HATU-mediated coupling. The Weinreb amide 5 was reduced to the aldehyde, which allowed for the formation of hemiaminal 6. A Wittig reaction completed the construction of the vinyl group at C3, forming vinyl compound 7. Reduction of the picolinamide group led to the formation of free amine 8, which upon reaction with 2-iodoxybenzoic acid gave ketone 9, the first major building block of the synthesis.

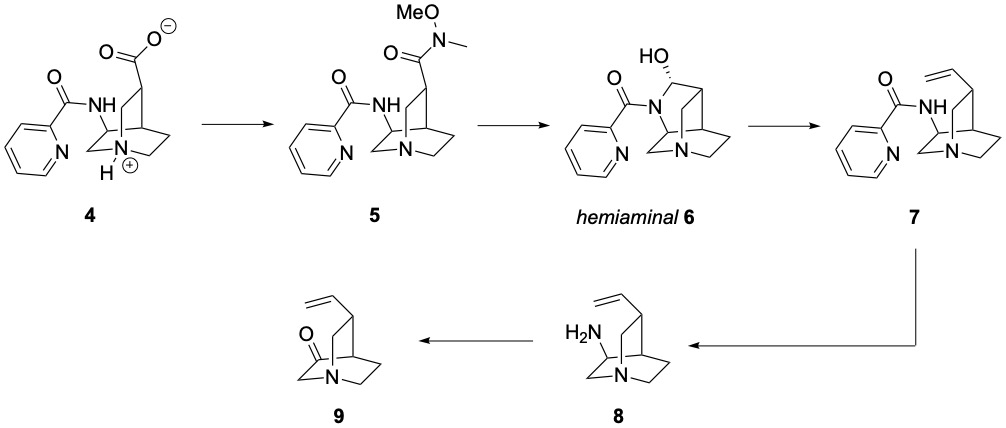

The aldol reaction of ketone 9 with 6-methoxyquinoline-4-carbaldehyde 9a was aided by conversion of the ketone moiety to a mesylhydrazone, allowing for purification of 10 without epimerization at the C8 center. This mesylhydrazone group could then be fully removed upon reaction with lithium aluminum hydride to give (–)-quinine 11.

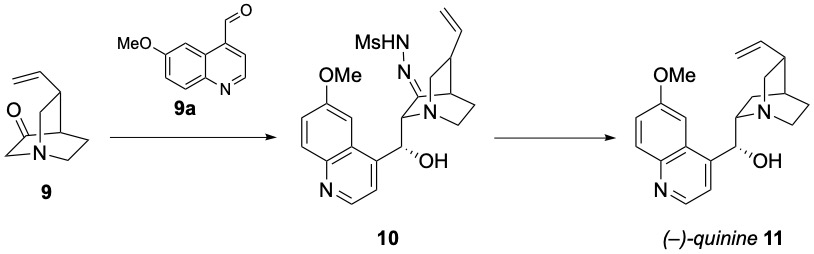
