= Pentyl nitrite =

Chemical compound

Clinical data
- Other names: n-Pentyl nitrate; n-Amyl nitrite; Nitramyl

Identifiers
- CAS Number: 463-04-7
- PubChem CID: 10026
- ChemSpider: 9632
- UNII: H2HUX79FYK
- ChEMBL: ChEMBL3188202
- CompTox Dashboard (EPA): DTXSID3024522
- ECHA InfoCard: 100.006.667

Chemical and physical data
- Formula: C_{5}H_{11}NO_{2}
- Molar mass: 117.148 g·mol^{−1}
- 3D model (JSmol): Interactive image
- Boiling point: 104 °C (219 °F)
- SMILES: CCCCCON=O
- InChI: InChI=1S/C5H11NO2/c1-2-3-4-5-8-6-7/h2-5H2,1H3; Key:CSDTZUBPSYWZDX-UHFFFAOYSA-N

Pentyl nitrite is a chemical compound with the molecular formula, classified as an alkyl nitrite, used as an antihypertensive medicine. It is also used to treat cyanide poisoning.

It is one of possible active ingredients for a recreational drug known as poppers.
