= Tape head cleaner =

Magnetic tape drive maintenance device

A tape head cleaner is a substance or device used for cleaning the record and playback heads of a magnetic tape drive, as found in video and audio tape machines, such as audio cassette players and VCRs. These machines require regular maintenance to perform properly. Particles that come off magnetic tape can build up on the record and playback heads, reducing the signal quality. Head cleaning may be done with a special cloth, long swabs, or a cleaning tape or cassette.

== Cleaning fluids ==
Fluids used for cleaning video heads include (but are not limited to) the following solvents:

- Dichlorodifluoromethane (discontinued in 1995 due to damage to the ozone layer).
- Alcohol (usually isopropyl alcohol or rubbing alcohol), effective for cleaning heads and guide rollers.
- Acetone, an effective solvent although it may damage plastics.
- Amyl nitrite and other nitrites marketed as video head cleaners.
- Xylene, an effective solvent although it may damage plastics.

== Dry cleaners ==
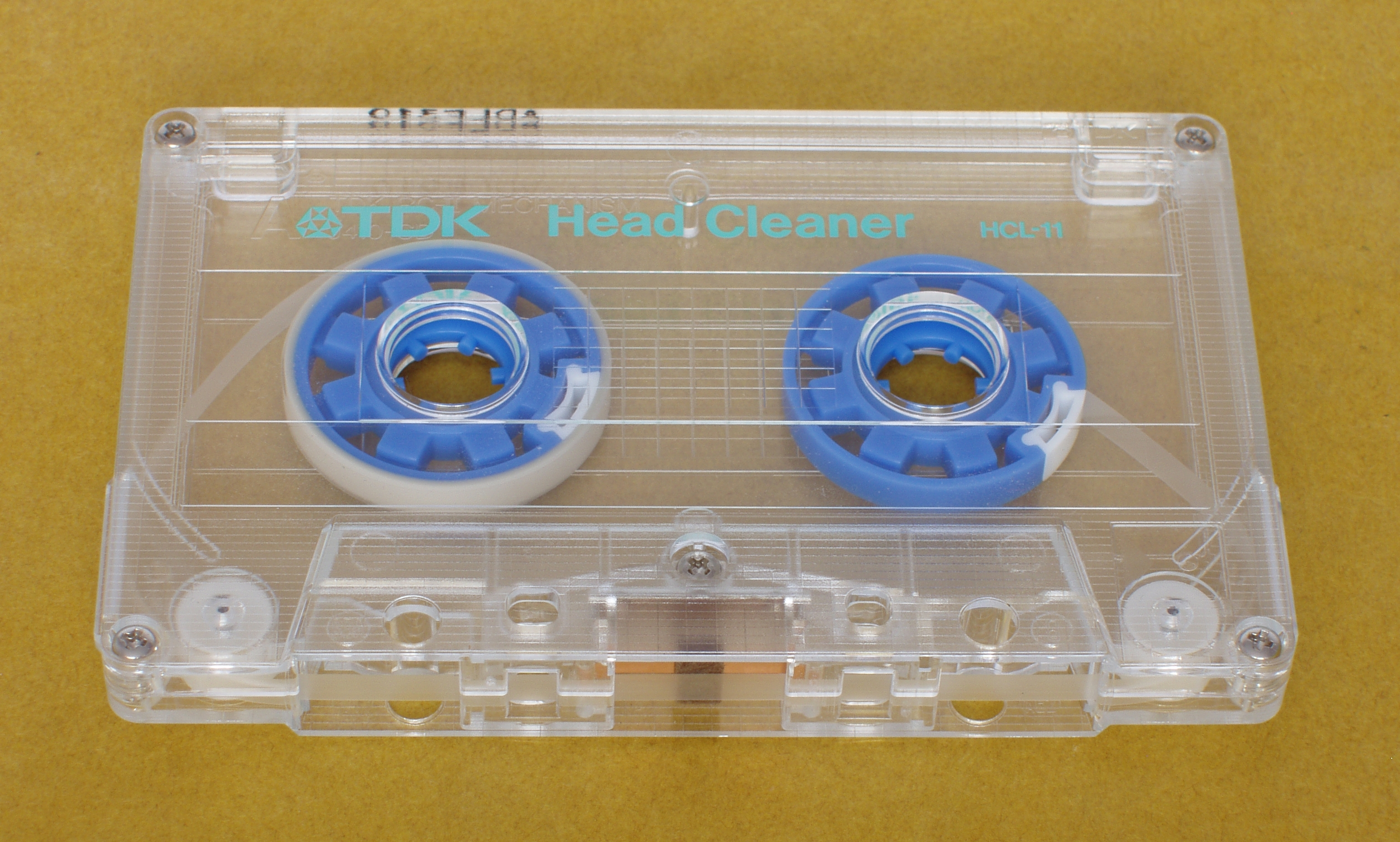
A head cleaning compact cassette

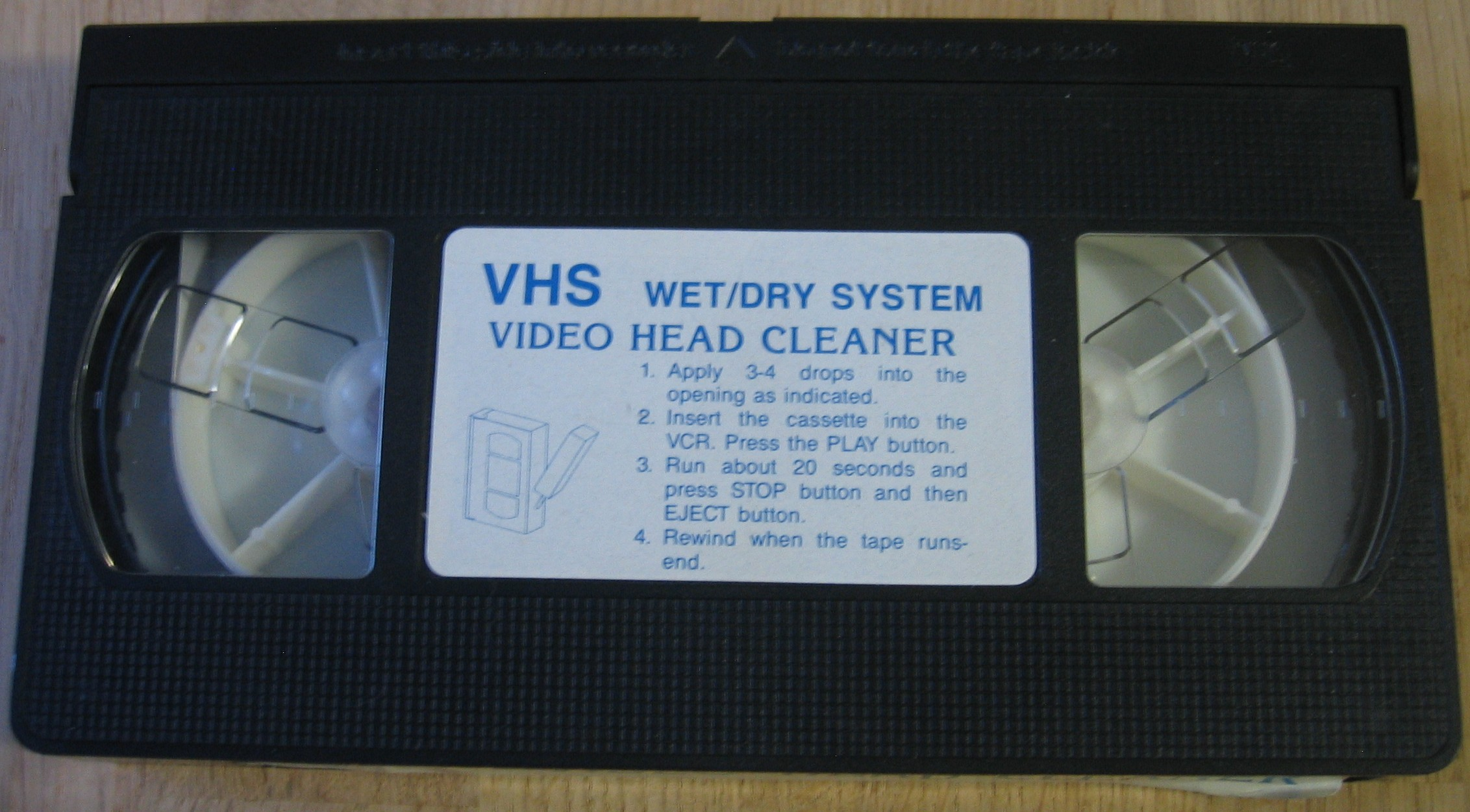
VHS head cleaning cassette

Dry methods of cleaning include:

- Compact Cassette-shaped devices that can be inserted into tape decks and played for a short time to polish the recording heads to remove smudges and dirt. This may shorten the life of the unit and should not be overused.
- Compact Cassette-shaped devices that have a cloth tape that can have liquid cleaning fluids added to it before being inserted into a tape deck and played for a short time. Similar cassettes exist for VHS.

== Other uses ==
In some countries, to evade anti-drug laws, poppers like amyl nitrite are labelled or packaged as tape head cleaner.

== See also ==
- Cassette demagnetizer
- VTR
- Rubbing alcohol
