= Isopropyl nitrite =

Chemical compound

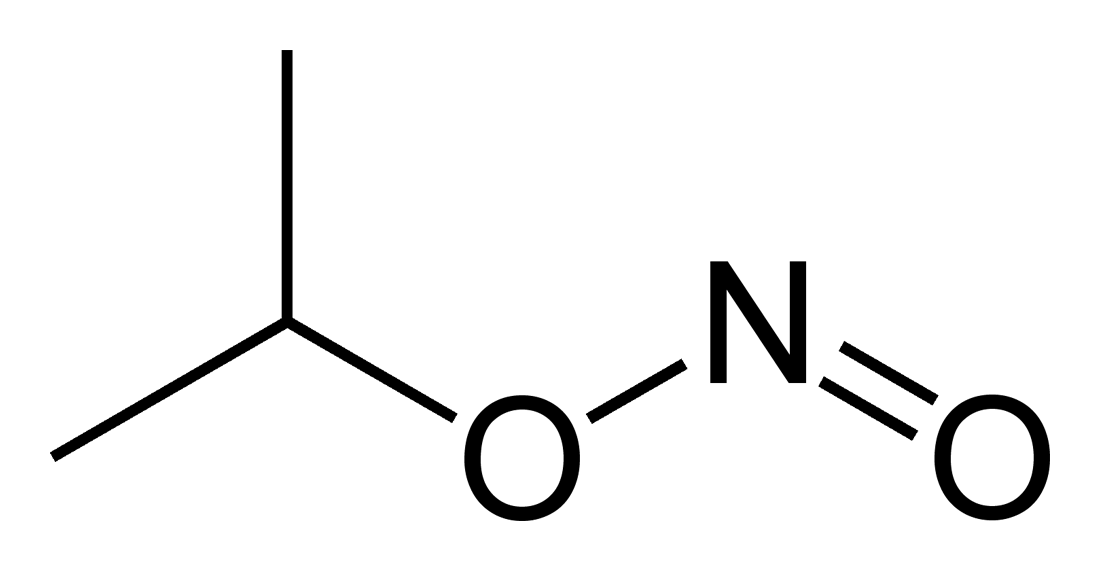

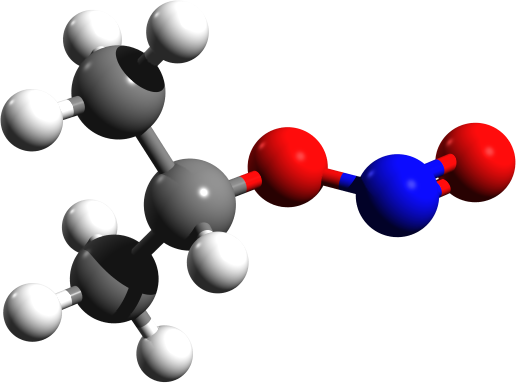

Clinical data
- Other names: Isopropyl alcohol nitrite; nitrous acid, isopropyl ester; 1-methylethyl nitrite; 2-propyl nitrite
- ATC code: None

Legal status
- Legal status: AU: S10 (Dangerous substance); BR: Class C1 (Other controlled substances); UK: Controlled Drug (Medicines Act 1968); US: Unscheduled (illegal under Crime Control Act of 1990)

Identifiers
- IUPAC name: 2-propyl nitrite
- CAS Number: 541-42-4
- PubChem CID: 10929
- ChemSpider: 10466
- UNII: 2T3Y2PS0ZE
- CompTox Dashboard (EPA): DTXSID3052191
- ECHA InfoCard: 100.007.982

Chemical and physical data
- Formula: C_{3}H_{7}NO_{2}
- Molar mass: 89.094 g·mol^{−1}
- 3D model (JSmol): Interactive image
- Density: 0.8684 g/cm^{3}
- Boiling point: 40 °C (104 °F)
- SMILES: O=NOC(C)C
- InChI: InChI=1S/C3H7NO2/c1-3(2)6-4-5/h3H,1-2H3; Key:SKRDXYBATCVEMS-UHFFFAOYSA-N

The chemical compound isopropyl nitrite (or 2-propyl nitrite) is an alkyl nitrite made from isopropanol. It is a clear pale yellow oil that is insoluble in water.

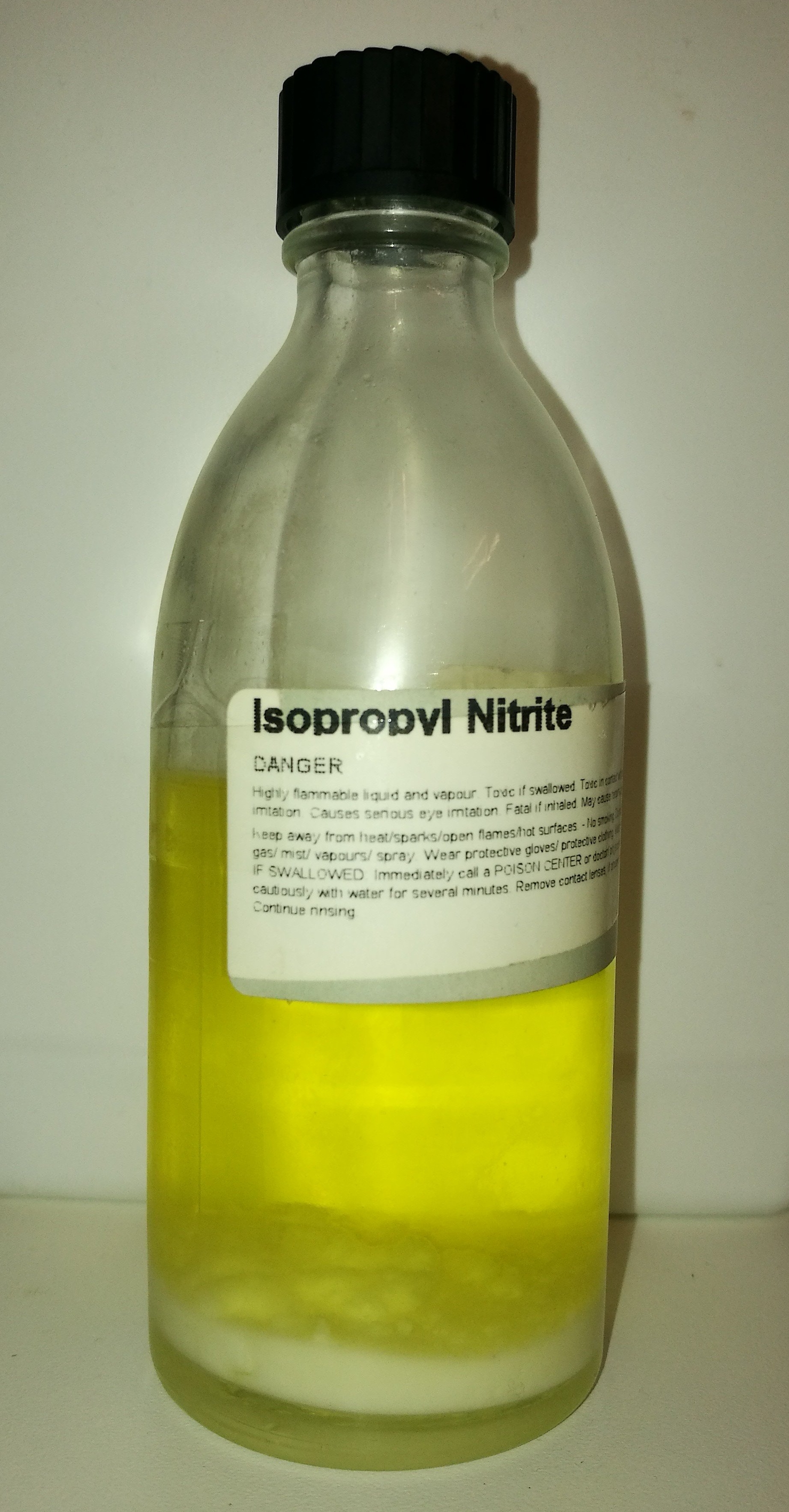
Isopropyl nitrite in a glass bottle

== Applications ==
Isopropyl nitrite is one of the compounds used as poppers, an inhalant drug that induces a brief euphoria.

== Safety ==
Isopropyl nitrite has been associated with eye maculopathy, visual impairment with central scotomata, bilateral foveal yellow spots, and inner segment/outer segment (IS/OS) junction disruption, which may be reversible.
