= Amyl nitrate =

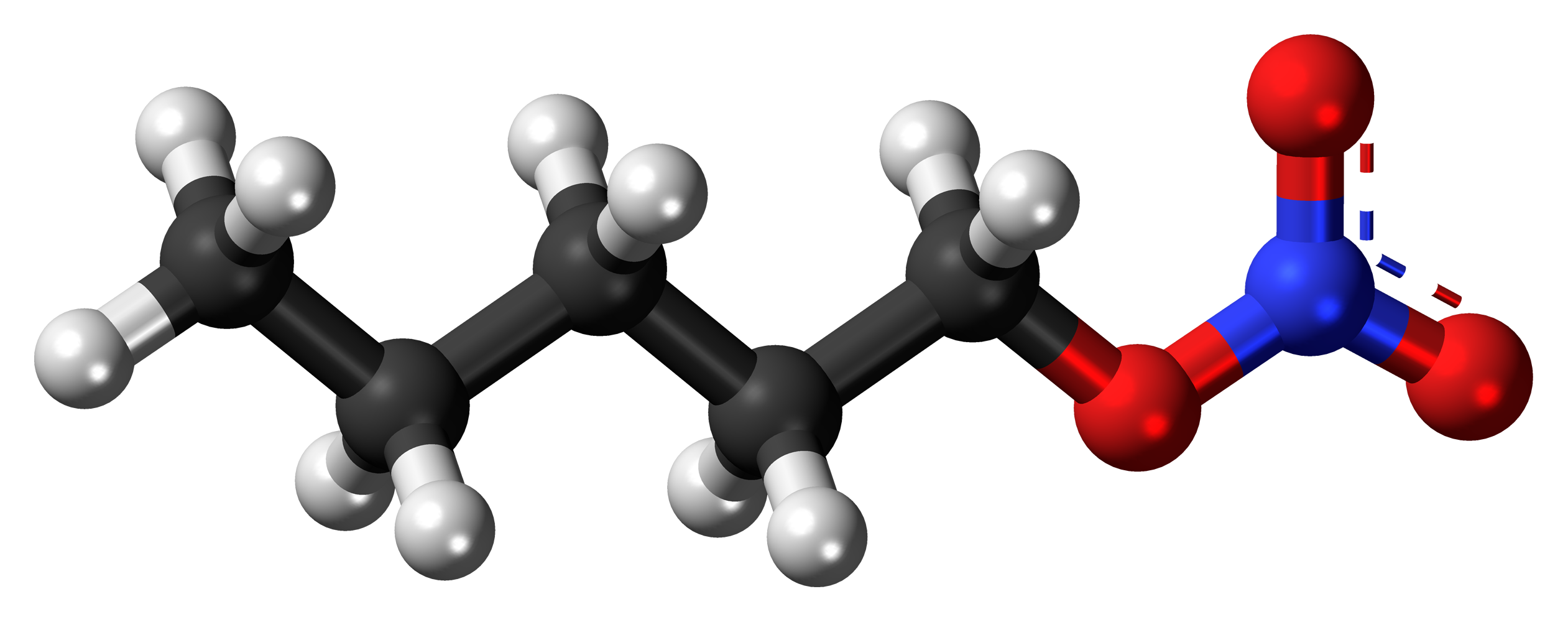

Names
- Preferred IUPAC name Pentyl nitrate
- Other names n-Amyl nitrate 1-Nitrooxypentane; 1-Pentyl nitrate

Identifiers
CAS Number	1002-16-0
3D model (JSmol)	Interactive image
ChemSpider	55191
ECHA InfoCard	100.012.440
EC Number	213-684-2
PubChem CID	61250
UNII	Z77A64H8TF
UN number	1112
CompTox Dashboard (EPA)	DTXSID2058708
- InChI: InChI=1S/C5H11NO3/c1-2-3-4-5-9-6(7)8/h2-5H2,1H3 Key: HSNWZBCBUUSSQD-UHFFFAOYSA-N
- SMILES: [O-][N+](=O)OCCCCC

Properties
Chemical formula	C_{5}H_{11}NO_{3}
Molar mass	133.147 g·mol^{−1}
Boiling point	104 °C (219 °F; 377 K)
Magnetic susceptibility (χ)	−76.4·10^{−6} cm^{3}/mol

Hazards
- GHS labelling
Pictograms	(GHS02: Flammable) (GHS07: Exclamation mark)
Signal word	Warning
Hazard statements	H226, H315, H319
Precautionary statements	P210, P233, P240, P241, P242, P243, P264, P280, P302+P352, P303+P361+P353, P305+P351+P338, P321, P332+P313, P337+P313, P362, P370+P378, P403+P235, P501
Flash point	47.8 °C (118.0 °F; 320.9 K)
- Except where otherwise noted, data are given for materials in their standard state (at 25 °C [77 °F], 100 kPa). verify (what is ?) Infobox references

Amyl nitrate is the chemical compound with the formula CH_{3}(CH_{2})_{4}ONO_{2}. This molecule consists of the 5-carbon amyl group attached to a nitrate functional group. It is the ester of amyl alcohol and nitric acid.

== Applications ==
Alkyl nitrates are employed as reagents in organic synthesis. Amyl nitrate is used as an additive in diesel fuel, where it acts as an "ignition improver" (cetane improver) by accelerating the ignition of fuel.

== See also ==
- Amyl nitrite – a similarly named chemical used to treat heart diseases and cyanide poisoning
