= Isobutyl nitrite =

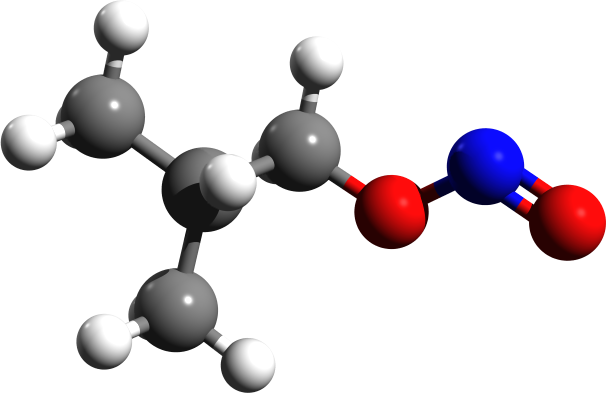

Names
- Preferred IUPAC name 2-Methylpropyl nitrite
- Other names Isobutyl nitrite

Identifiers
CAS Number	542-56-3
3D model (JSmol)	Interactive image
ChEBI	CHEBI:46643
ChemSpider	10493
ECHA InfoCard	100.008.018
PubChem CID	10958
UNII	GW9WAB6QOM
CompTox Dashboard (EPA)	DTXSID3020750
- InChI: InChI=1S/C4H9NO2/c1-4(2)3-7-5-6/h4H,3H2,1-2H3 Key: APNSGVMLAYLYCT-UHFFFAOYSA-N; InChI=1/C4H9NO2/c1-4(2)3-7-5-6/h4H,3H2,1-2H3 Key: APNSGVMLAYLYCT-UHFFFAOYAF
- SMILES: O=NOCC(C)C

Properties
Chemical formula	C_{4}H_{9}NO_{2}
Molar mass	103.11976
Appearance	Colorless liquid
Odor	Almond-like
Density	0.87 g/mL
Boiling point	67 °C (153 °F; 340 K)
Solubility in water	Slightly soluble

Hazards
- Occupational safety and health (OHS/OSH)
Main hazards	Highly flammable
Legal status	AU: S4 (Prescription only); BR: Class C1 (Other controlled substances)
- Except where otherwise noted, data are given for materials in their standard state (at 25 °C [77 °F], 100 kPa). verify (what is ?) Infobox references

Isobutyl nitrite, C_{4}H_{9}NO_{2}, is an alkyl nitrite, an ester of isobutanol and nitrous acid. Its chemical structure is (CH_{3})_{2}CH-CH_{2}-ONO.

Isobutyl nitrite is a pungent colorless liquid. It acts as a vasodilator, and is used as an inhalant recreational drug, poppers.

== Applications ==
Isobutyl nitrite is one of the compounds used as poppers, an inhalant drug that induces a brief euphoria. Also, it is used as part of the antidote package for cyanide poisoning.

== Safety ==
May cause headaches, dizziness and fainting. Isobutyl nitrite is poisonous to people with glucose-6-phosphate dehydrogenase deficiency.
