= Cleaning card =

Cleaning cards are disposable products designed to clean the interior contact points of a device that facilitates an electronic information transaction (point of sale terminal, automated teller machine, remote deposit check scanners, micr readers, magnetic stripe reader, bill acceptor, bill validator, access control locks, etc.). In order for the cleaning card to work properly in the device, the card resembles or mimics the material of the transaction media – such as a credit card, check, or currency. As the cleaning card is inserted and passed through the device, it will clean components that would normally come in contact with the transaction media such as readers, lenses, read/write chip and pins, belts, rollers, and paths. Cleaning card products are widely accepted and endorsed by device manufacturers and industry professionals. Many have developed their own cleaning cards to better clean their particular devices.

A typical cleaning card is much like a wiper or sponge that can get into areas that are not readily accessible. Typically, the cleaning card has a solid core covered by a soft wipe-like material. The product is then saturated with a cleaning solution recommended by the device manufacturer and then placed in a sealed pouch to maintain the saturation level and cleanliness of the card.

== Invention and Evolution ==
The cleaning card was originally patented by Stanley H. Eyler and the patent (US#5525417 A) was assigned to his employer, the Clean Team Company. The Clean Team Company later changed its name to KICTeam, Inc., which continues to be the leading manufacturer of their brand's Waffletechnology cleaning cards. The cleaning card has evolved with the equipment they need to clean. A good example is the bill acceptor. Initially, the bill acceptor was designed for vending machines as a means of selling candy to the public. It includes a device that recognizes that a US one dollar bank note has been inserted. The cleaning card was required to be the same shape as US currency in order to be accepted into the device to clean it. Vending machines began accepting higher denominations as well as having the ability to make change. Specialized sensors were introduced into the bill acceptors to recognize multiple denominations and to only accept media that contained bank note characteristics. The bill acceptor cleaning card was redeveloped to contain magnetic ink and bank note characteristics so as to be accepted by the equipment. The development of bill acceptors for slot machines in the gaming and casino industry required the bill acceptor to be more sophisticated. The bill validators needed to validate currency of multiple denominations up to a one hundred dollar bank note. Fraud was now a critical issue and was addressed by multiple sensors and optics throughout the inserted currency pathway. These sensors and optics were recessed so as to keep currency from running across them with each insertion and wearing down sensitive lenses.

== Area of application ==
Cleaning cards are used in the gaming, wagering, vending, hotel, retail, lottery, petroleum, manufacturing, shipping, auto id, card printing, banking. For example, this includes all places that credit cards or cash are inserted into a machine to make payments.

=== Cleaning of the magnetic head ===
The magnetic head inside the POS Terminal is a fixed component and for this reason it only can be cleared by cleaning cards that are flexible enough to clean the leading, center and trailing edges of this round reader head. The cleaning of the magnetic head is very important because it's responsible for the reading of the card and so it decides acceptance or rejection of the inserted card. The cleaning card is not only cleaning the reading area of the magnetic head which is cleared. There is also a cleaning process within the device along the card path. The cleaning in these high dirt build-up areas is especially important and ensures efficient cleaning of the card reader.

=== Cleaning of chip reading contacts ===
Chip Cards are also known as Smart Cards and EMV Cards. There are two different types of EMV card readers - friction and landing. Contaminated contacts can result in rejection of the inserted payment or authorization card; the built up minerals can damage electronics. The cleaning card with ensures optimal cleaning of chip reading contacts.

=== Cleaning of motorized card readers ===
Motorized readers are built in, for example ATMs. The credit/debit-card is inserted into the card slot, where the first magnetic head is placed. If a magnetic stripe can be recognized, a shutter will be opened and the card will be transported to the second magnetic head by roles. The card is read, thereby the device knows whether the transaction goes over the micro chip or the magnetic stripe. If no micro chip is placed on the card, the transaction goes directly above the magnetic head. If the data gives the order for a transaction over the micro chip, the card is placed on the chip reading contact and is stopped. The chip contacts, are fitted on the chip and now the transaction begins. If the reading of the magnetic stripe respectively by the micro chip is not possible, the card will be declined. A cleaning card for a motorized card reader will need a magnetic stripe built into it to activate the acceptance shutter.

=== Cleaning of check and document scanners ===
Check scanners are used by banks or business through remote deposit capture programs to take a digital image of the check and send the information to the bank for deposit. This is where the image of a check on your bank statement originates. If a check scanner is not properly cleaned financial institutions risk increased transaction failures, equipment malfunctions, personnel costs to reconcile poor images, equipment repair or exchange and non-compliance due to poor image quality. A cleaning card designed to clean a specific model of check scanner is run through the device the same way the operator would run a check through the device. The cleaning card makes contact with the optical lenses, micr reader, transport belts and rollers, print heads and clears the check path.

== Transactions Terminology ==
Transactions are any action that has a monetary implication or transfer information from one media to another. The most commonly thought of transactions are the use of credit or debit cards through a card reader of some type. Card readers are also widely used for hotel door locks or access control devices. Another of the most common is a currency transaction via vending, slot machines, or self-checkout kiosk where a bill acceptor takes currency or a currency detector tabulates quantity. Many printers are transaction devices such as cashless ticket printers in the gaming industry.

== See also ==
- Check 21 Act
- Magnetic stripe card
