= Glidant =

Additive to improve flow of a powder

A glidant is a substance that is added to a powder to improve its flowability. A glidant will only work at a certain range of concentrations. Above a certain concentration, the glidant will in fact function to inhibit flowability.

In tablet manufacture, glidants are usually added just prior to compression.

== Examples ==
Examples of glidants include ascorbyl palmitate, calcium palmitate, magnesium stearate, fumed silica (colloidal silicon dioxide), starch and talc.

== Mechanism of action ==
A glidant's effect is due to the counter-action of factors that cause poor flowability of powders. For instance, correcting surface irregularity, reducing interparticular friction and decreasing surface charge. The result is a decrease in the angle of repose which is an indication of an enhanced powder's flowability.
