= Flowability =

Physical property of a powder

Flowability, also known as powder flow, is a property that defines an ability of a powdered material to flow, related to cohesion.

Powder flowability depends on many traits:

- the shape and size of the powder particles due to intermolecular force,
- porosity
- electrostatic activity
- hygroscopy
- bulk density
- angle of repose
- presence of glidants
- oxidation rate (of a metallic powder)
- humidity

ISO 4490:2018 norm (and its precedent, ISO 4490:2014) standardizes a method for determining the flow rate of metallic powders. It uses a normalized/calibrated funnel, named Hall flowmeter.

== See also ==
- Fluid mechanics
- Soil mechanics
- Cohesion (geology)
- angle of repose
