= Ethyl nitrite =

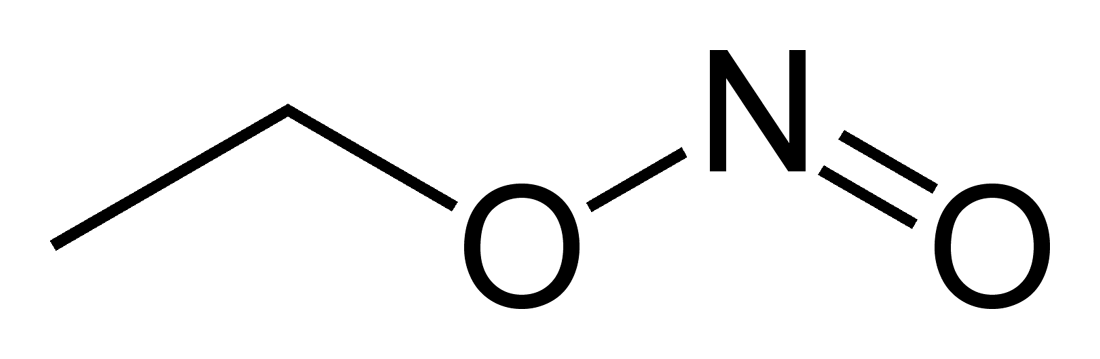

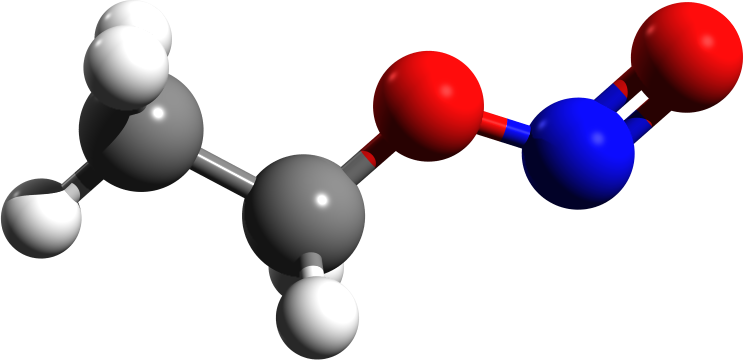

Names
- Preferred IUPAC name Ethyl nitrite
- Other names 1-Nitrosooxyethane; Ethyl alcohol nitrite Nitrous acid Nitrous ether Ethyl ester Nitrethyl

Identifiers
CAS Number	109-95-5
3D model (JSmol)	Interactive image
ChEMBL	ChEMBL1551365
ChemSpider	7735
ECHA InfoCard	100.003.385
PubChem CID	8026
UNII	8C7CJ279RV
CompTox Dashboard (EPA)	DTXSID9046574
- InChI: InChI=1S/C2H5NO2/c1-2-5-3-4/h2H2,1H3 Key: QQZWEECEMNQSTG-UHFFFAOYSA-N; InChI=1/C2H5NO2/c1-2-5-3-4/h2H2,1H3 Key: QQZWEECEMNQSTG-UHFFFAOYAU
- SMILES: O=NOCC

Properties
Chemical formula	C_{2}H_{5}NO_{2}
Molar mass	75.067 g·mol^{−1}
Boiling point	17 °C (63 °F; 290 K)
Solubility in water	5.07 g/100 ml

Hazards
- Occupational safety and health (OHS/OSH)
- Main hazards
NFPA 704 (fire diamond)	2 4 4
- Except where otherwise noted, data are given for materials in their standard state (at 25 °C [77 °F], 100 kPa). verify (what is ?) Infobox references

The chemical compound ethyl nitrite is an alkyl nitrite with a chemical formula C_{2}H_{5}NO_{2}. It may be prepared from ethanol.

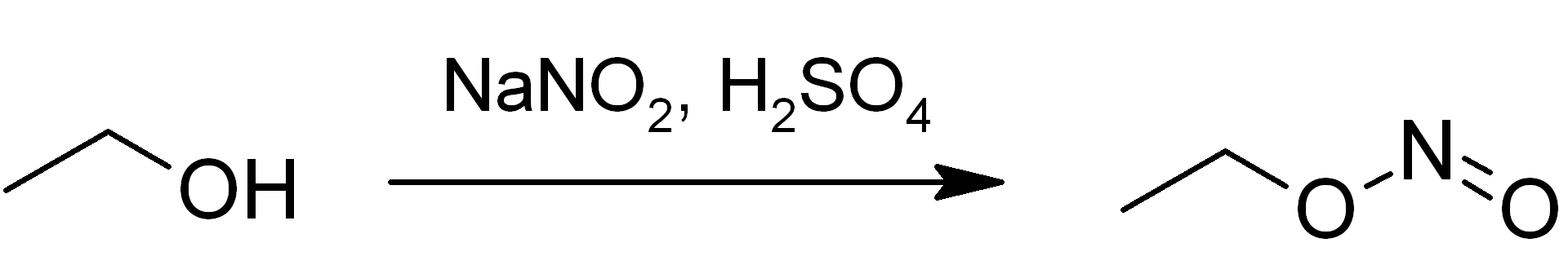

== Uses ==
It is used as a reagent with butanone to yield the dimethylglyoxime end product.

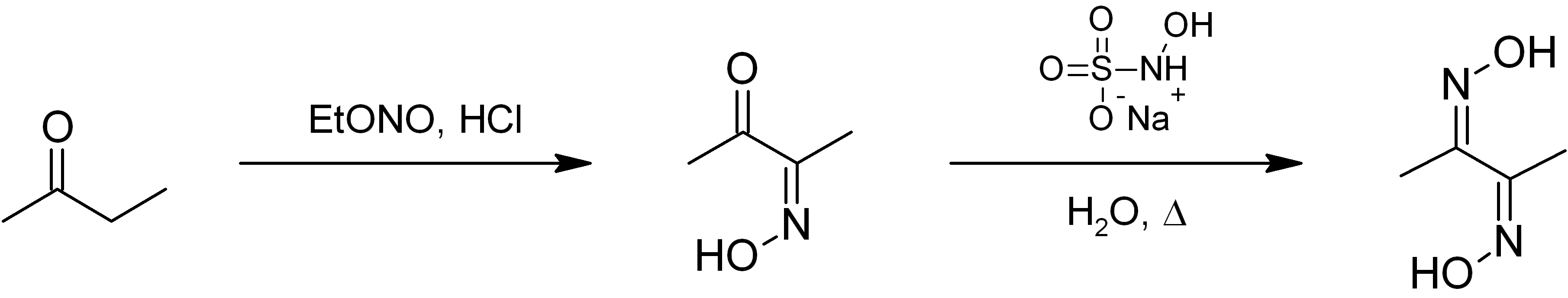

Ethyl nitrite is the main ingredient in a traditional ethanol-based South African remedy for colds and flu known as Witdulsies, which is sold in pharmacies. It is known as a traditional Afrikaans remedy; the same remedy is apparently made by the Amish in the US. However, FDA has blocked over-the-counter sales of this same remedy, known in the US as sweet nitrite or sweet spirit of nitre, since 1980. Its use has been associated with fatal methemoglobinemia.

Methemoglobinemia is the primary toxic effect of ethyl nitrite. Due to ethyl nitrite's high volatility and faint smell, in the presence of ethyl nitrite vapors, it is easy to breathe a high dose of it without realizing, resulting in methemoglobinemia, which may or may not be severe, or even fatal.
