= Methyl nitrite =

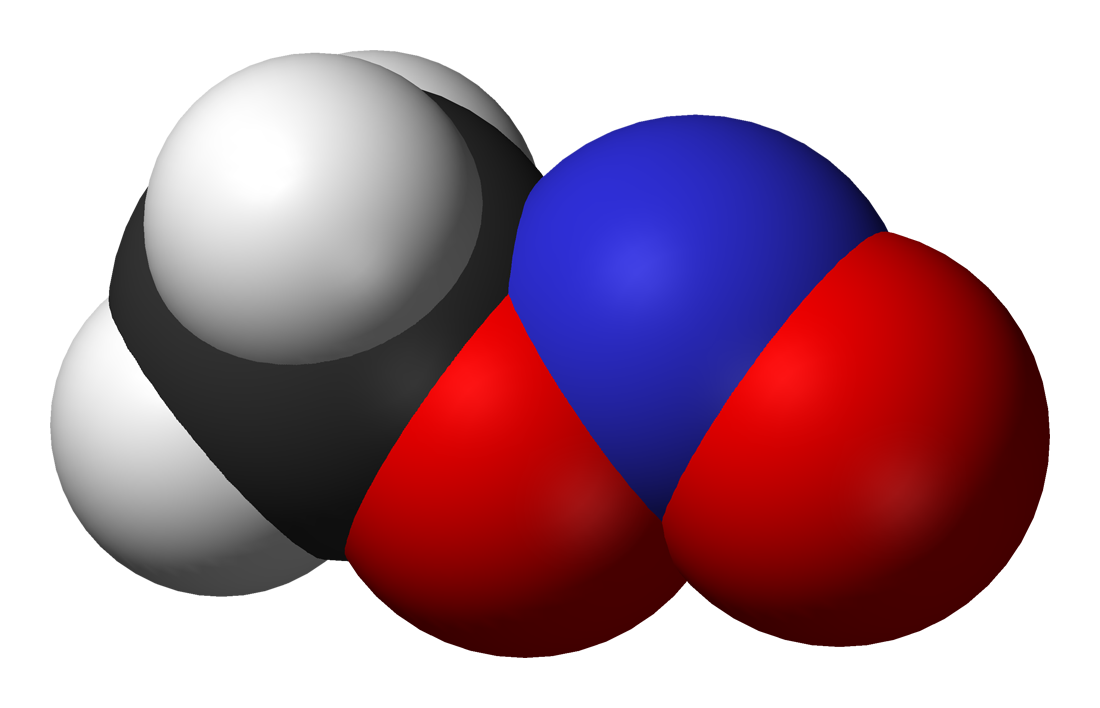

Names
- Preferred IUPAC name Methyl nitrite

Identifiers
CAS Number	624-91-9
3D model (JSmol)	Interactive image
ChemSpider	11730
ECHA InfoCard	100.009.882
PubChem CID	12231
UNII	96TLP8RN37
CompTox Dashboard (EPA)	DTXSID8060795
- InChI: InChI=1S/CH3NO2/c1-4-2-3/h1H3 Key: BLLFVUPNHCTMSV-UHFFFAOYSA-N; InChI=1/CH3NO2/c1-4-2-3/h1H3 Key: BLLFVUPNHCTMSV-UHFFFAOYAL
- SMILES: O=NOC

Properties
Chemical formula	CH_{3}NO_{2}
Molar mass	61.040 g·mol^{−1}
Appearance	Yellow gas
Density	0.991 g/cm^{3}
Melting point	−16 °C (3 °F; 257 K)
Boiling point	−12 °C (10 °F; 261 K)

Thermochemistry
Std enthalpy of formation (Δ_{f}H^{⦵}_{298})	−66.1 kJ/mol

Hazards
Safety data sheet (SDS)	External MSDS
- Except where otherwise noted, data are given for materials in their standard state (at 25 °C [77 °F], 100 kPa). verify (what is ?) Infobox references

Methyl nitrite is an organic compound with the chemical formula CH_{3}ONO. It is a gas, and is the simplest alkyl nitrite.

== Structure ==
At room temperature, methyl nitrite exists as a mixture of cis and trans conformers. The cis conformer is 3.13 kJ mol^{−1}, more stable than the trans form, with an energy barrier to rotation of 45.3 kJ mol^{−1}. The cis and trans structure have also been determined by microwave spectroscopy (see external links).

cis-methyl nitrite	trans-methyl nitrite

== Synthesis ==
Methyl nitrite can be prepared by the reaction of silver nitrite with iodomethane: Silver nitrite (AgNO_{2}) exists in solution as the silver ion, Ag^{+} and the nitrite ion, NO_{2}^{−}. One of the lone pairs on an oxygen from nitrite ion attacks the methyl group (−CH_{3}), releasing the iodide ion into solution. Unlike silver nitrite, silver iodide is highly insoluble in water and thus forms a solid. Note that nitrogen is a better nucleophile than oxygen and most nitrites would react via an S_{N}2-like mechanism and the major product would be nitromethane. For example, sodium and potassium nitrite reacting with iodomethane would produce mostly nitromethane, with methyl nitrite as the minor product. However, the presence of the silver ion in solution has a stabilizing effect on the formation of carbocation intermediates, increasing the percent yield of methyl nitrite. In either case, some nitromethane and methyl nitrite are both formed.

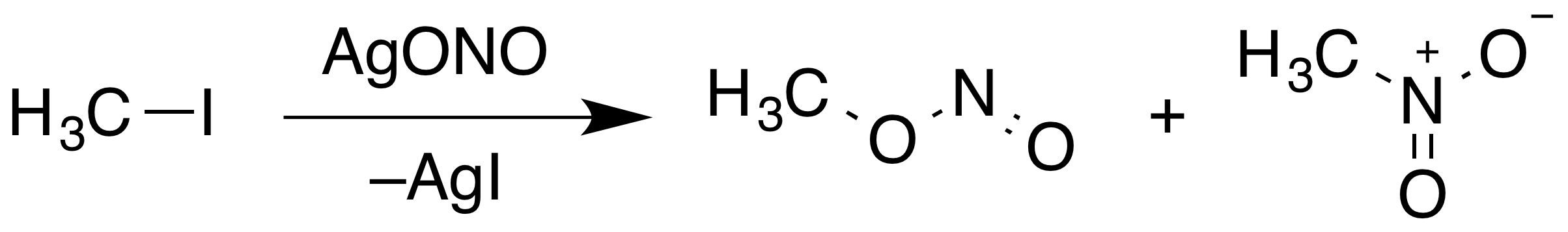

The figure shows the two gas-phase structures of methyl nitrite, as determined by IR and microwave spectroscopy.

Methyl nitrite free of nitromethane can be made by reacting iodomethane with nitrogen dioxide:

2 CH_{3}I + 2 NO_{2} → 2 CH_{3}ONO + I_{2}

== Properties and uses ==
Methyl nitrite is a precursor and intermediate, e.g. during production of phenylpropanolamine.

Methyl nitrite is also present in aged cigarette smoke. Here it is presumably formed from nitrogen dioxide (itself formed by oxidation of nitric oxide) and methanol.

== Environmental impact ==
As one product of the combustion of unleaded petrol in air, methyl nitrite has been proposed as a cause of the decline of insects, and hence that of songbirds in Europe.

== Regulations ==
Under 15 U.S. Code § 2057b, methyl nitrite is banned due to it falling under the category of a volatile alkyl nitrite, which is intended to restrict harm that could result from the production and distribution of hazardous materials. Exceptions arise from 21 U.S.C. § 301, which permits the approved use of volatile alkyl nitrites under certain exemptions; however, it remains restricted in all cases intended for administration to a person. The aspects of methyl nitrite result in it being difficult to properly contain due to its gaseous form at room temperature, which results in it being highly unstable. As a result, the transportation of methyl nitrite has been banned within the United States under the Hazardous Materials Regulations (HMR). Methyl nitrite is fully restricted from all forms of transportation due to its classification within the Hazardous Material Table (HMT), which classifies it as forbidden.

== Safety ==
Methyl nitrite is a toxic asphyxiating gas, a potent cyanotic agent. Exposure may result in methemoglobinemia.

Methyl nitrite is an oxidizing agent and a heat-sensitive explosive; its sensitivity increases in presence of metal oxides. With inorganic bases it forms explosive salts. It forms explosive mixtures with air. It is used as a rocket propellant, a monopropellant. It explodes more violently than ethyl nitrite. Lower alkyl nitrites may decompose and burst the container even when stored under refrigeration.

== See also ==
- Nitromethane
- Organic chemistry
- Nucleophilic substitution

== Cited sources ==
- Haynes, William M., ed. (2011). CRC Handbook of Chemistry and Physics (92nd ed.). CRC Press. ISBN 978-1439855119.
