= Thialdine =

Names
- IUPAC name 2,4,6-Trimethyl-1,3,5-dithiazinane
- Other names Dihydro-2,4,6-trimethyl-4H-1,3,5-dithiazine

Identifiers
CAS Number	86241-90-9; (all-cis): 638-17-5
3D model (JSmol)	Interactive image; (all-cis): Interactive image
ChEBI	CHEBI:179054
ChemSpider	12001
ECHA InfoCard	100.010.295
EC Number	211-323-3
PubChem CID	12518
UNII	ZKG651IE9G
CompTox Dashboard (EPA)	DTXSID10862338
- InChI: InChI=1S/C6H13NS2/c1-4-7-5(2)9-6(3)8-4/h4-7H,1-3H3 Key: FBMVFHKKLDGLJA-UHFFFAOYSA-N
- SMILES: CC1NC(SC(S1)C)C; (all-cis): C[C@H]1N[C@@H](C)S[C@@H](C)S1

Properties
Chemical formula	C_{6}H_{13}NS_{2}
Molar mass	163.30 g·mol^{−1}
- Except where otherwise noted, data are given for materials in their standard state (at 25 °C [77 °F], 100 kPa). Infobox references

Thialdine is a basic heterocyclic chemical compound with the molecular formula C_{6}H_{13}NS_{2}.

== Preparation ==
Thialdine was first synthesized by Justus von Liebig and Friedrich Wöhler in 1847 by passing hydrogen sulfide through a solution of acetaldehyde ammonia trimer, with thialdine crystallizing from the solution.

Preparation of thialdine

Acetaldehyde ammonia trimer is the cyclic trimer formed in the condensation reaction of acetaldehyde with ammonia:

3 CH_{3}CHO + 3 NH_{3} → (CH_{3}CHNH)_{3} + 3 H_{2}O

The aldehyde ammonia does not need to be isolated as an intermediate.

The configuration of the three methyl groups in thialdine can differ, so that multiple cis-trans isomers are possible. However, X-ray diffraction has shown that in practice thialdine occurs in the all-cis configuration.

All-cis-thialidine

== Uses ==
Thialdine is used as a flavoring agent in foods. It is included in the list of flavoring substances authorized in the European Union and is considered generally recognized as safe (GRAS) in the United States. The FEMA number of thialdine is 4018. Thialdine has a roasted meat smell and is therefore used as a flavoring in meat.

Salts of thialdine have been used as an antioxidant additive in lubricating oils.

Thialdine and similar compounds have been proposed as rubber vulcanization accelerators.
