= Tert-Butyl nitrite =

tert-Butyl nitrite

Identifiers
CAS Number	540-80-7
3D model (JSmol)	Interactive image
ChemSpider	10444
ECHA InfoCard	100.007.962
EC Number	208-757-0
PubChem CID	10906
UNII	4780H7U8LU
CompTox Dashboard (EPA)	DTXSID10202316
- InChI: InChI=1S/C4H9NO2/c1-4(2,3)7-5-6/h1-3H3 Key: IOGXOCVLYRDXLW-UHFFFAOYSA-N
- SMILES: CC(C)(C)ON=O

Properties
Chemical formula	C_{4}H_{9}NO_{2}
Molar mass	103.121 g·mol^{−1}
Appearance	colorless liquid
Density	0.867 g/mL
Boiling point	61–63 °C (142–145 °F; 334–336 K)

Hazards
- GHS labelling
Pictograms	(GHS02: Flammable) (GHS07: Exclamation mark)
Signal word	Danger
Hazard statements	H225, H302, H332
Precautionary statements	P210, P233, P240, P241, P242, P243, P261, P264, P270, P271, P280, P301+P312, P303+P361+P353, P304+P312, P304+P340, P312, P330, P370+P378, P403+P235, P501
- Except where otherwise noted, data are given for materials in their standard state (at 25 °C [77 °F], 100 kPa). Infobox references

tert-Butyl nitrite is an organic compound with the formula (CH_{3})_{3}CONO. A colorless liquid, it is the tert-butyl ester of nitrous acid and is typically employed as a solution with tert-butyl alcohol.

== Use ==
The compound is used as a reagent in organic synthesis. It reacts with secondary amides to give N-nitroso amides:

RC(O)N(H)R + (CH_{3})_{3}CONO → RC(O)N(NO)R + (CH_{3})_{3}COH

== See also ==
- Butyl nitrite
