= Butyl nitrite =

Chemical compound

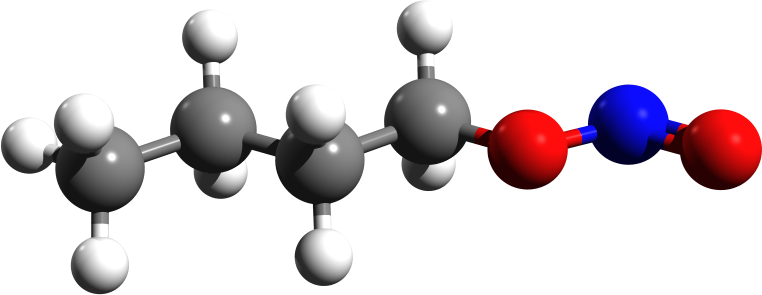

Clinical data
- ATC code: none

Legal status
- Legal status: AU: S4 (Prescription only); UK: Controlled Drug (Medicines Act 1968); US: Unscheduled (illegal under Anti-Drug Abuse Act of 1988)

Identifiers
- IUPAC name: 1-nitrosooxybutane
- CAS Number: 544-16-1
- PubChem CID: 10996
- ChemSpider: 10530
- UNII: 44P8QG0F3T
- CompTox Dashboard (EPA): DTXSID8049418
- ECHA InfoCard: 100.008.057

Chemical and physical data
- Formula: C_{4}H_{9}NO_{2}
- Molar mass: 103.121 g·mol^{−1}
- 3D model (JSmol): Interactive image
- Boiling point: 78.0 °C (172.4 °F)
- SMILES: CCCCON=O
- InChI: InChI=1S/C4H9NO2/c1-2-3-4-7-5-6/h2-4H2,1H3; Key:JQJPBYFTQAANLE-UHFFFAOYSA-N

Butyl nitrite is the organic compound with the formula CH_{3}(CH_{2})_{3}ONO. It is an alkyl nitrite made from n-butanol. Butyl nitrite is used recreationally as poppers. Synonyms include 1-butyl nitrite, n-butyl nitrite and nitrous acid butyl ester.

It can be prepared by treating nitrous acid (generated in situ) with n-butanol.

== Applications ==
Butyl nitrite is one of the compounds used as poppers, inhalant drugs that induce brief euphoria. It was developed by Clifford Hassing, a graduate student in Los Angeles, as a faster-acting analog of alkyl nitrite. Among the inhalants' trade names are Rush, Locker Room, and Bolt. They are sometimes marketed as "Cleaner", liquid incense, or room odorizer. It is used for its euphoric effect and for relaxing the smooth muscles during sexual intercourse.

Butyl nitrite is an important reagent in the synthesis of both organic and inorganic compounds and in the production of various other nitrites. It is often used as a nitrosating agent, particularly for the production of nitrosamines.

== See also ==
- tert-butyl nitrite
