= Poppers =

Class of recreational drug

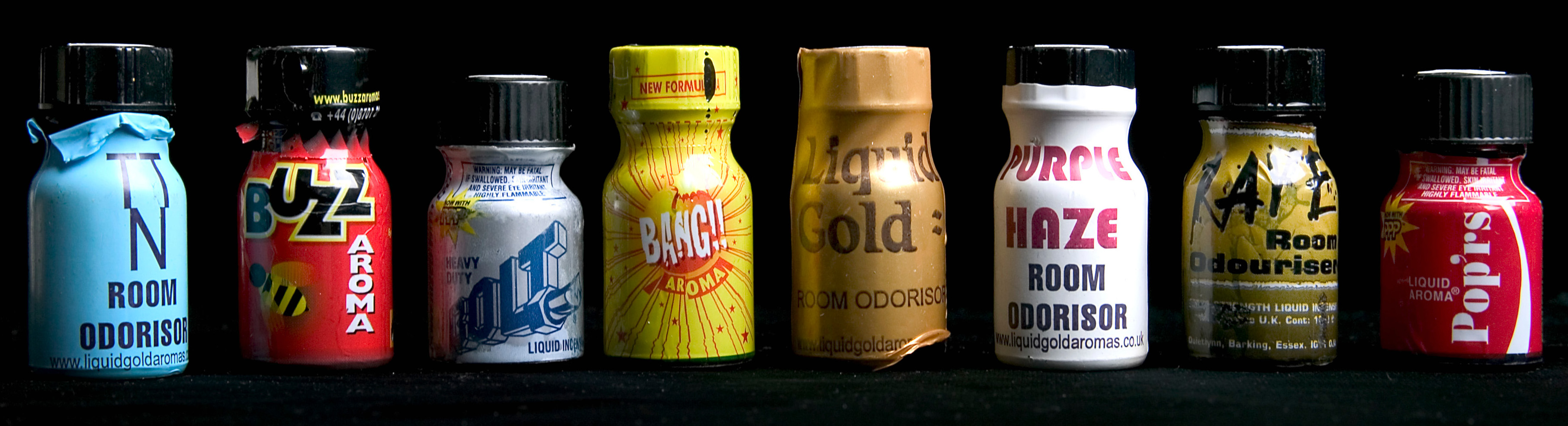
- A selection of over-the-counter poppers on display

Clinical data
- Other names: popper, poppe, pops, amyl
- Routes of administration: Inhalation
- Drug class: Vasodilator

Legal status
- Legal status: AU: S4 (Prescription only) in general; some exceptions; CA: Illegal; NZ: Prescription-only; UK: OTC; US: OTC; Elsewhere, usually available OTC

Pharmacokinetic data
- Bioavailability: When inhaled, Amyl nitrite: unknown; Isopropyl nitrite: 43%; Isobutyl nitrite: unknown
- Metabolism: Liver
- Metabolites: Amyl nitrite: pentanol (amyl alcohol); Isopropyl nitrite: isopropanol; Isobutyl nitrite: isobutanol
- Onset of action: 15 seconds
- Elimination half-life: Suspected to be minutes to less than an hour
- Duration of action: 30 seconds to 5 minutes
- Excretion: Primarily urine

Chemical and physical data
- Formula: Depends on primary active ingredient
- Molar mass: Depends on primary active ingredient
- Boiling point: Depends on primary active ingredient

Poppers are recreational drugs belonging to the alkyl nitrite family of chemical compounds. When fumes from these substances are inhaled, they act as potent vasodilators, producing mild euphoria, warmth, and dizziness. Most effects have a rapid onset and are short-acting. Their recreational use is believed to be potentially dangerous for people with heart problems, anaemia, or glaucoma. Reported adverse effects include fainting, retinal toxicity, and vision loss. As poppers include a broad range of chemical types, their legality differs across different jurisdictions. They are often packaged under the guise of room deodorizer, leather polish, nail polish remover, or videotape head cleaner to evade anti-drug laws.

The term poppers comes from the popping sound made when glass vials of the substance were crushed to release the vapors for inhalation. Amyl nitrite was originally prescribed in the late 1800s for the medical management of angina. Many analogues exist, such as isoamyl nitrite, isopentyl nitrite, isopropyl nitrite, and isobutyl nitrite. These substances are subject to different regulations; for example, isobutyl nitrite is banned in the European Union.

Poppers act as muscle relaxants, causing the relaxation of involuntary smooth muscles such as the throat and anus. Such physiological effects, along with others (such as mild euphoria), have resulted in poppers being used as recreational drugs, sometimes during sexual intercourse, as the effects can heighten arousal and help facilitate acts such as anal intercourse. Poppers were a part of the club culture which began during the mid-1970s disco scene, and surged in popularity during the rave scene of the 1980s and 1990s.

== Administration and effects ==
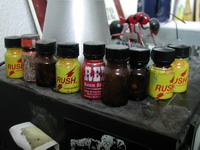
A selection of poppers

=== Administration ===
Poppers come in liquid form, but this liquid is not directly consumed. When the bottle is opened, the vapors are inhaled, rather than the liquid. This is typically done through the nasal cavities, typically directly from the bottle, without touching the bottle to the skin, or with the help of small inhalers.

=== Effects ===
==== Physiological effects ====
Inhaling nitrites produces a fast-acting, short-lived and non-specific relaxation of smooth muscles (along with the sphincter muscles of the anus and the vagina). Blood vessels are surrounded by smooth musculature, which directly influences blood pressure by increasing or decreasing its inward pressure on the blood vessels.

With relaxation of the smooth muscles, the 'inward' pressure on the blood vessels decreases and they dilate, resulting in a drop in blood pressure and an immediate (compensatory) increase in heart rate (reflex tachycardia). Vasodilation may cause giddiness, dizziness, headache, nausea, vomiting and flushing, and may produce a sensation of heat and excitement. Maximum vasodilatory effect is usually reached within 30 seconds, with (secondary) physiological effects lasting for 5 to 10 minutes.

==== Psychological effects ====
Inhaling nitrites produces several psychological effects such as euphoria, increased sensual awareness, lowered inhibitions or increased confidence, and potential for impaired judgement and disorientation.

== Interactions ==
=== Vasodilators ===
Addiction experts in psychiatry, chemistry, pharmacology, forensic science, epidemiology, and the police and legal services engaged in delphic analysis regarding 20 popular recreational drugs. Alkyl nitrites were ranked 20th in social and physical harm, and 18th in dependence.

Alkyl nitrites interact with other vasodilators, such as sildenafil (Viagra), vardenafil (Levitra), and tadalafil (Cialis), to cause a serious decrease in blood pressure, which can cause strokes, and low blood pressure leading to people fainting. Side effects of popper abuse include tachycardia, headaches, migraines, dizziness and fainting.

=== Toxicity ===
The Merck Manual of Diagnosis and Therapy reports insignificant hazard associated with inhalation of alkyl nitrites, and British governmental guidance on the relative harmfulness of alkyl nitrites places them among the less harmful of recreational drugs. If in contact with the skin, butyl nitrite poppers can cause chemical burns and contact dermatitis of the skin around the mouth and nose.

Swallowing poppers (rather than inhaling the vapour) may cause cyanosis, methemoglobinemia, unconsciousness, coma and complications leading to death. Accidental aspiration of amyl or butyl nitrites may cause lipoid pneumonia.

Health officials are reporting an increase in deaths and hospitalizations associated with the intentional consumption or inhalation of nitrite products for recreational purposes, including to enhance sexual performance.

==== Isopropyl nitrite ====
Isopropyl nitrite poppers may be a cause of maculopathy (eye damage), as reported in France and the United Kingdom. Some studies have concluded that there may be increased risk for at least temporary retinal damage with habitual poppers use in certain users; in a letter to the New England Journal of Medicine, an ophthalmologist described four cases in which recreational users of isopropyl nitrite poppers suffered temporary changes in vision. In November 2014, it was observed that maculopathy is a rare complication of isopropyl nitrite abuse. A full recovery of visual acuity in longterm abuse could be demonstrated after drug abstinence. Studies have shown that poppers users who have HIV and/or use Sildenafil in combination with poppers are at an increased risk of developing poppers‐associated maculopathy.

Foveal (center-of-gaze) damage has also been described, in six habitual users of isopropyl nitrite poppers. Furthermore, in June 2014, optometrists and ophthalmologists reported having noticed an increase in vision loss in chronic poppers users in the United Kingdom associated with isopropyl nitrite (substitute for isobutyl nitrite which was banned in 2007).

==== Isobutyl nitrite ====
A working group in 2019 from the International Agency for Research on Cancer determined there to be "sufficient evidence" to suggest carcinogenic properties of isobutyl nitrite on experimental animals, and because they could not find any sufficient studies regarding its carcinogenic effects on humans, they determined that isobutyl nitrite is "possibly carcinogenic to humans". The group primarily looked at 2 studies on animals, one on rats and one on mice. Both of these involved the administration of doses of isobutyl nitrite at seemingly low doses (0, 37.5, 75, or 150 ppm) 6 hours a day, 5 days a week, for a total of 103 weeks. This is different from the relatively brief exposure to isobutyl nitrite that inhaling poppers recreationally usually provides. Nonetheless, in the studies there was shown to be no increase in death rates for the animals exposed to isobutyl nitrite, but there was shown to be an increase in tumors in the lungs of the males and females of both species in the groups exposed, as well as in the thyroids of the male mice exposed. Isobutyl Nitrite is no longer sold as 'Poppers' having been banned in the EU since 2007 and banned in the US since 1990.

=== Refuted link with HIV/AIDS ===
Early in the AIDS crisis, widespread use of poppers among AIDS patients led to the later disproved hypothesis that poppers contributed to the development of Kaposi's sarcoma, a rare form of cancer that occurs in AIDS patients. Modest, short-term reductions in immune function were observed in animal studies, but not replicated in human studies.

=== Cyanide treatment ===
Amyl nitrites were part of some kits used to treat cyanide poisoning, containing amyl nitrite, sodium nitrite, and sodium thiosulfate. The nitrites were administered to produce methemoglobin and induce vasodilation. Amyl nitrites were discontinued in 2012 in standard cyanide kits. Cyanide kits now use hydroxocobalamin.

== Chemistry ==
Poppers contain a class of chemicals called alkyl nitrites. To the extent that poppers products contain alkyl nitrites, the following applies.

The following table summarizes alkyl nitrite chemical and physical properties, including chemical structure:

Alkyl nitrite	CAS	Formula	Molecular weight (g·mol^{−1})	Physical state	Color	Boiling point
Amyl nitrite (isoamyl nitrite, isopentyl nitrite)	110-46-3	(CH_{3})_{2}CH(CH_{2})_{2}ONO	117.15	liquid	yellow	97–99 °C (207–210 °F)
Pentyl nitrite (n-pentyl nitrite)	463-04-7	CH_{3}(CH_{2})_{4}ONO	117.15	liquid	yellow	104 °C (219 °F)
Butyl nitrite (n-butyl nitrite)	544-16-1	CH_{3}(CH_{2})_{3}ONO	103.12	liquid	yellow	78 °C (172 °F)
Isobutyl nitrite (2-methylpropyl nitrite)	542-56-3	(CH_{3})_{2}CHCH_{2}ONO	103.12	liquid	colorless (transparent)	67 °C (153 °F)
Isopropyl nitrite (2-propyl nitrite)	541-42-4	(CH_{3})_{2}CHONO	89.09	liquid	yellow	39 °C (102 °F)
Hexyl nitrite	638-51-7	CH_{3}(CH_{2})_{5}ONO	131.17	liquid	colorless (transparent)	130 °C (266 °F)

== History ==
=== 19th-century discovery ===
The French chemist Antoine Jérôme Balard synthesized amyl nitrite in 1844. Sir Thomas Lauder Brunton, a Scottish physician born in the year of amyl nitrite's first synthesis, documented its clinical use to treat angina pectoris in 1867 when patients experiencing chest pains would experience complete relief after inhalation. Brunton was inspired by earlier work with the same agent, performed by Arthur Gamgee and Benjamin Ward Richardson. Brunton reasoned that the angina sufferer's pain and discomfort could be reduced by administering amyl nitrite—to dilate the coronary arteries of patients, thus improving blood flow to the heart muscle.

Amyl nitrites were originally enclosed in a glass mesh called "pearls". The usual administration of these pearls was done by crushing them between the fingers, followed by a popping sound. This administration process seems to be the origin of the slang term "poppers". It was then administered via direct inhalation of the vapors or inhalation through silk that covered the capsule.

Brunton found that amyl nitrites had effects of dilating blood vessels and flushing of the face. Isobutyl nitrites were also documented around the late 1890s by Brunton and despite being found to have generally the same effects as amyl nitrites, they were never used as a clinical alternative to amyl nitrates. Brunton also found that propyl nitrites had the same effects as well.

=== 20th century ===
Although amyl nitrite is known for its practical therapeutic applications, the first documented case of recreational use was in 1964. The poppers "craze" began in the early 1970s in the gay male community in bars, discothèques and bathhouses. It was packaged and sold pharmaceutically in fragile glass ampoules wrapped in cloth sleeves which, when crushed or "popped" in the fingers, released the amyl nitrite for inhalation, hence the colloquialism poppers. The term extended to the drug in any form as well as to other drugs with similar effects, e.g. butyl nitrite which is packaged under a variety of trade names in small bottles.

In the late 1970s, Time magazine and The Wall Street Journal reported that poppers use among gay men began as a way to enhance sexual pleasure, but "quickly spread to avant-garde heterosexuals". A series of interviews conducted in the late 1970s revealed a wide spectrum of users.

=== 21st century ===
Poppers were well established in the gay community, with more than a third of gay men in the United States having used poppers at least once. Poppers were partial inspiration for songs such as Troye Sivan's 2023 song "Rush".

== Legal status ==
=== Australia ===
Poppers are legal in Australia, and from 2020, poppers can also be purchased as a Schedule 3 substance from pharmacies, or a Schedule 4 substance with a prescription.

==== History of poppers legislation in Australia ====
In June 2018, the Therapeutic Goods Administration (TGA) motioned to reschedule alkyl nitrites to be in the same category as heroin and cocaine (Schedule 9). This was met by criticism from the LGBTQI community for being discriminatory and further evidence was demanded and further consultation sought. In October 2018, the Australian Federation of AIDS Organisations (AFAO) pointed out the lack of quality evidence provided by the TGA to justify the rescheduling and that use of amyl nitrites has been stable over the past decade with very little evidence of harm and has been in use by a high proportion of gay men over a long period. A final decision was pushed back from 29 November 2018 to late January or early February 2019 for further consultation with the public. As of March 2019, two public meetings have taken place in Sydney and Melbourne with The Kirby Institute and the Australian Research Centre in Sex, Health and Society (ARCSHS). Along with 70 written public proposals, there was significant opposition to alkyl nitrites rescheduling. Banning alkyl nitrites was not considered acceptable as their use was said to help reduce harms such as anal injury and blood-borne disease transmission during anal sex. In June 2019, Australia decided not to ban poppers.

=== Canada ===
Since 2013, Health Canada has banned all distribution and sales of poppers.

=== Continental Europe ===
Since 2007, reformulated poppers containing isopropyl nitrite are sold in the EU; isobutyl nitrite is prohibited.

In France, the sale of products containing butyl nitrite has been prohibited since 1990 on grounds of danger to consumers. In 2007, the government extended this prohibition to all alkyl nitrites that were not authorized for sale as drugs. After litigation by sex shop owners, this extension was quashed by the Council of State on the grounds that the government had failed to justify such a blanket prohibition: according to the court, the risks cited, concerning rare accidents often following abnormal usage, rather justified compulsory warnings on the packaging.

The possession in Germany, Austria and Switzerland is not subject to any regulations regarding anesthetic drugs and is therefore legal; however, the purchase, sale or trade of amyl nitrite without permission violates the drug laws of the corresponding countries. Occasionally, poppers were seized from sex shops, when sold there illegally.

=== United Kingdom ===
Poppers are sold in nightclubs, bars, sex shops, drug paraphernalia head shops, over the Internet and in markets. It is illegal under Medicines Act 1968 to sell them advertised for human consumption. The Advisory Council on the Misuse of Drugs noted in 2011 that poppers, rather than being a psychoactive substance or a legal high, "appear to fall within the scope of The Intoxicating Substances (Supply) Act 1985".

The Psychoactive Substances Act 2016, scheduled to be enacted 1 April 2016, was initially claimed to impose a blanket ban on the production, import and distribution of all poppers. On 20 January 2016 a motion to exempt poppers (alkyl nitrites) from this legislation was defeated. This was opposed by Conservative MP Ben Howlett. Howlett's fellow Conservative MP Crispin Blunt declared that he has used and currently uses poppers. Manufacturers expressed concern over loss of business and potential unemployment.

In March 2016, the Advisory Council on the Misuse of Drugs stated that, because alkyl nitrites do not directly stimulate or depress the central nervous system, poppers do not fall within the scope of the Psychoactive Substances Act 2016.

=== United States ===
Amyl nitrite was originally marketed as a prescription drug in 1937. It remained so until 1960, when the Food and Drug Administration removed the prescription requirement due to its safety record. This requirement was reinstated in 1969, after observing an increase in recreational use. There was a huge increase in the number of brands for butyl nitrites after the FDA put in the prescription requirement again in 1969.

Butyl nitrites were outlawed in 1988 by the Anti-Drug Abuse Act of 1988. This prompted distributors to sell other alkyl nitrites not yet banned, like isopropyl nitrite. In 1990, isopropyl nitrites and other nitrites not yet banned were outlawed by the Crime Control Act of 1990. Both of these laws include an exception for commercial purpose, defined as any use other than for the production of consumer products containing volatile alkyl nitrites meant for inhaling or otherwise introducing volatile alkyl nitrites into the human body for euphoric or physical effects.

== See also ==
- Alcohol and sex
- Sex and drugs
