= Alkyl nitrite =

Organic compounds of the form R–O–N=O

General formula of alkyl nitrites

In organic chemistry, alkyl nitrites are a group of organic compounds based upon the molecular structure R−O−N=O, where R represents an alkyl group. Formally they are alkyl esters of nitrous acid. They are distinct from nitro compounds (R−NO_{2}).

The first few members of the series are volatile liquids; methyl nitrite and ethyl nitrite are gaseous at room temperature and pressure. The compounds have a distinctive fruity odor. Another frequently encountered nitrite is amyl nitrite (3-methylbutyl nitrite).

Alkyl nitrites were initially, and largely still are, used as medications and chemical reagents, a practice which began in the late 19th century. In their use as medicine, they are often inhaled for relief of angina and other heart-related symptoms of disease. However, when referred to as "poppers", alkyl nitrites represent recreational drugs.

== Synthesis and properties ==
Organic nitrites are prepared from alcohols and sodium nitrite in sulfuric acid solution. They decompose slowly on standing, the decomposition products being oxides of nitrogen, water, the alcohol, and polymerization products of the aldehyde. They are also prone to undergo homolytic cleavage to form alkyl radicals, the nitrite C–O bond being very weak (on the order of 40–50 kcal ⋅ mol^{−1}). Alkyl nitrites are generally weak nitrosating agents, but nitrosate amines in the presence of a nucleophile catalyst.

== Reactions ==
- tert-Butyl nitrite has been shown to be an effective reagent for the selective nitration of phenols and aryl sulfonamides
- n-Butyl nitrite and ammonia convert phenylhydroxylamine to its nitrosamine derivative cupferron. Likewise pyrrolidine is a substrate for ethyl nitrite.
- Alkyl nitrites are also used in the formation of oximes with the stronger carbon acids and acid or base catalysis for example in the reaction of 2-butanone, ethyl nitrite and hydrochloric acid forming the oxime, the similar reaction with phenacyl chloride, or the reaction of phenylacetonitrile with methyl nitrite and sodium hydroxide.

An isolated but classic example of the use of alkyl nitrites can be found in Woodward and Doering's quinine total synthesis:

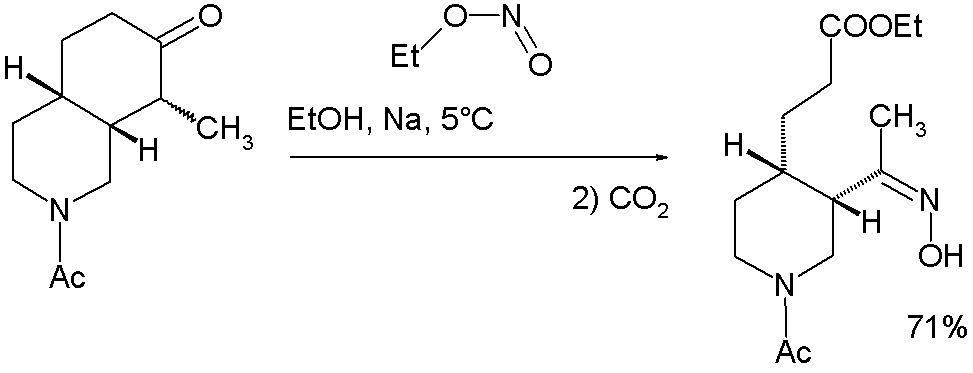

for which they proposed this reaction mechanism:

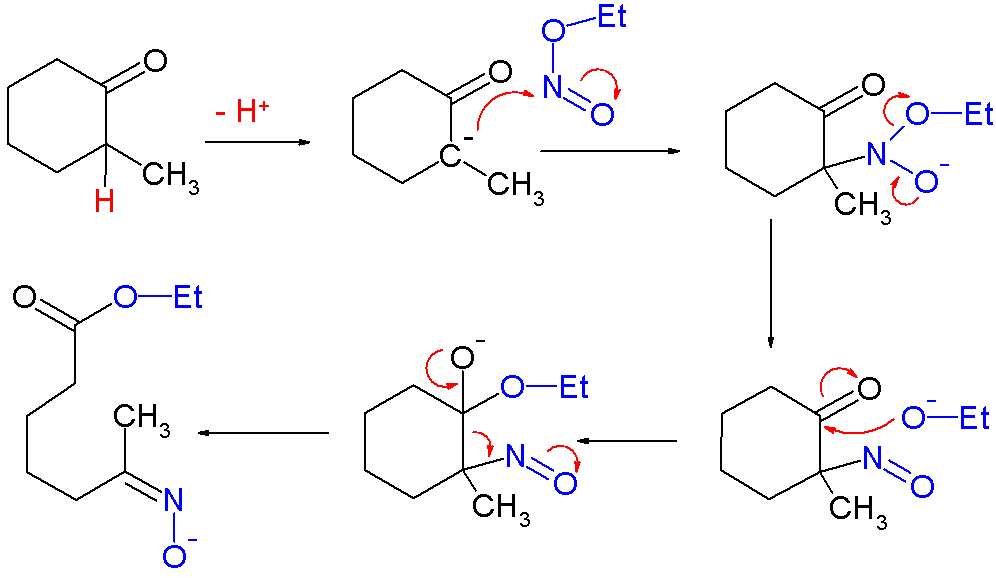
