= Amyl nitrite =

Chemical compound

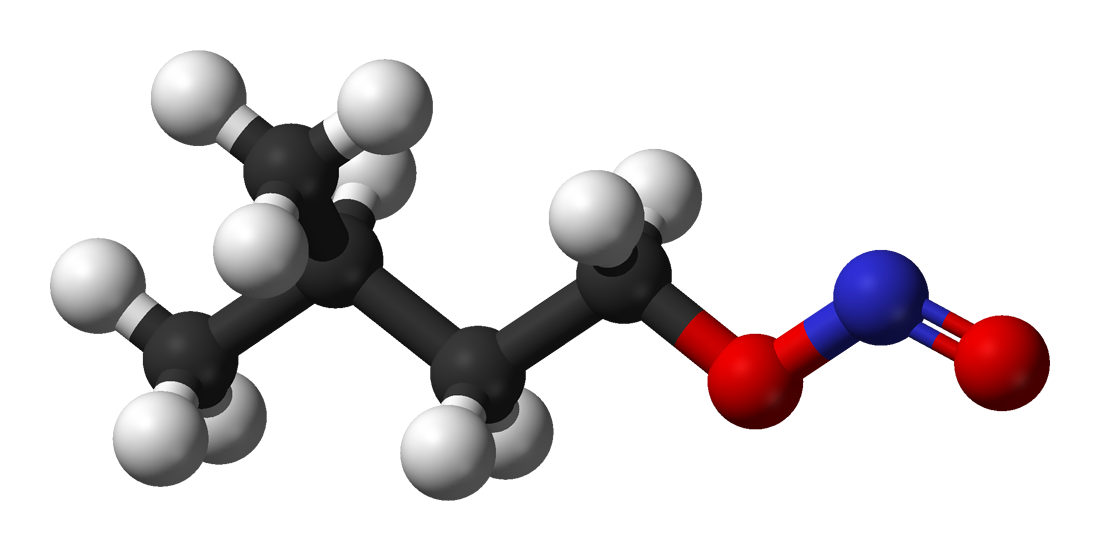

Clinical data
- Other names: Isoamyl nitrite, Isopentyl nitrite, Nitramyl, 3-methyl-1-nitrosooxybutane, Pentyl alcohol nitrite (ambiguous), poppers (ambiguous, colloquial, slang)
- Drug class: Euphoriant; Anxiolytic; Muscle relaxant; Vasodilator
- ATC code: V03AB22 (WHO)

Legal status
- Legal status: AU: S3 (Pharmacist only) / S4 (Prescription only); BR: Class C1 (Other controlled substances); DE: Unscheduled (unauthorized sale and purchase illegal); UK: Controlled Drug (Medicines Act 1968); US: Unscheduled (illegal under Crime Control Act of 1990)

Identifiers
- IUPAC name: (3-methylbutyl) nitrite
- CAS Number: 110-46-3
- PubChem CID: 8053
- DrugBank: DB01612
- ChemSpider: 7762
- UNII: 5N0U5TUC9Z
- KEGG: D00517
- ChEBI: CHEBI:2691
- CompTox Dashboard (EPA): DTXSID9025455

Chemical and physical data
- Formula: C_{5}H_{11}NO_{2}
- Molar mass: 117.148 g·mol^{−1}
- 3D model (JSmol): Interactive image
- Density: 0.872 g/cm^{3}
- Boiling point: 99 °C (210 °F)
- Solubility in water: Slightly soluble mg/mL (20 °C)
- SMILES: CC(C)CCON=O
- InChI: InChI=1S/C5H11NO2/c1-5(2)3-4-8-6-7/h5H,3-4H2,1-2H3; Key:OWFXIOWLTKNBAP-UHFFFAOYSA-N

Amyl nitrite is a chemical compound with the formula C_{5}H_{11}NO_{2}. A variety of isomers are known, but they all feature an isoamyl group attached to the nitrite functional group. The alkyl group (the isoamyl in this case) is unreactive and the chemical and biological properties are mainly due to the nitrite group. Like other alkyl nitrites, amyl nitrite is bioactive in mammals, being a vasodilator, which is the basis of its use as a prescription medicine. As an inhalant, it also has a psychoactive effect, which has led to its recreational use, with its smell being described as that of old socks or dirty feet. It was first documented in 1844 and came into medical use in 1867.

== Uses ==
- Amyl nitrite was historically employed medically to treat heart diseases as well as angina.
- Amyl nitrite was sometimes used as an antidote for cyanide poisoning. It was thought to act as an oxidant, to induce the formation of methemoglobin. Methemoglobin in turn can sequester cyanide as cyanomethemoglobin. However, it has been replaced by hydroxocobalamin which had better efficacy, and the use of amyl nitrite has been found to be ineffective and unscientific.
- Amyl nitrite is sometimes used as an antidote for hydrogen sulfide toxicity, given in conjunction with sodium nitrite. The nitrite bonds with haemoglobin to form sulfmethemoglobin which in turn binds to hydrogen sulfide, preventing it from binding to tissue, but triggering sulfhemoglobinemia in the process. The use of amyl nitrite for this purpose is considered anecdotal; the CDC notes that it should not interfere with the establishment of adequate ventilation and oxygenation, and must be administered immediately to be most effective.
- Trace amounts are added to some perfumes.
- It is also used recreationally as an inhalant drug that induces a brief euphoric state, and when combined with other intoxicant stimulant drugs such as cocaine or MDMA, the euphoric state intensifies and is prolonged. Once some stimulative drugs wear off, a common side effect is a period of depression or anxiety, colloquially called a "come down"; amyl nitrite is sometimes used to combat these negative after-effects. This effect, combined with its dissociative effects, has led to its use as a recreational drug.

== Nomenclature ==
The term "amyl nitrite" encompasses several isomers. In older literature, the common non-systematic name amyl was often used for the pentyl group, where the amyl group is a linear or normal (n) alkyl group, and the resulting amyl nitrite would have the structural formula CH_{3}(CH_{2})_{3}CH_{2}ONO, also referred to as n-amyl nitrite.

A common form of amyl nitrite is the isomer with the formula (CH_{3})_{2}CHCH_{2}CH_{2}ONO, which may be more specifically referred to as isoamyl nitrite.

The similarly named amyl nitrate has very different properties. At the same time, isopropyl nitrite has a similar structure and similar uses (also called 'poppers') but with worse side-effects.

Amyl nitrite is sometimes referred to colloquially as banapple gas.

== Synthesis and reactions ==
Alkyl nitrites are prepared by the reaction of alcohols with nitrous acid:

ROH + HONO → RONO + H_{2}O, where R = alkyl group

The reaction is called esterification. Synthesis of alkyl nitrites is, in general, straightforward and can be accomplished in home laboratories. A common procedure includes the dropwise addition of concentrated sulfuric acid to a cooled mixture of an aqueous sodium nitrite solution and an alcohol. The intermediately-formed stoichiometric mixture of nitrogen dioxide and nitric oxide then converts the alcohol to the alkyl nitrite, which, due to its low density, will form an upper layer that can be easily decanted from the reaction mixture.

Isoamyl nitrite decomposes in the presence of base to give nitrite salts and the isoamyl alcohol:

C_{5}H_{11}ONO + NaOH → C_{5}H_{11}OH + NaNO_{2}

Amyl nitrite, like other alkyl nitrites, reacts with carbanions to give oximes.

Amyl nitrites are also useful as reagents in a modification of the Sandmeyer reaction. The reaction of the alkyl nitrite with an aromatic amine in a halogenated solvent produces a radical aromatic species, this then frees a halogen atom from the solvent. For the synthesis of aryl iodides diiodomethane is used, whereas bromoform is the solvent of choice for the synthesis of aryl bromides.

== Physiological effects ==
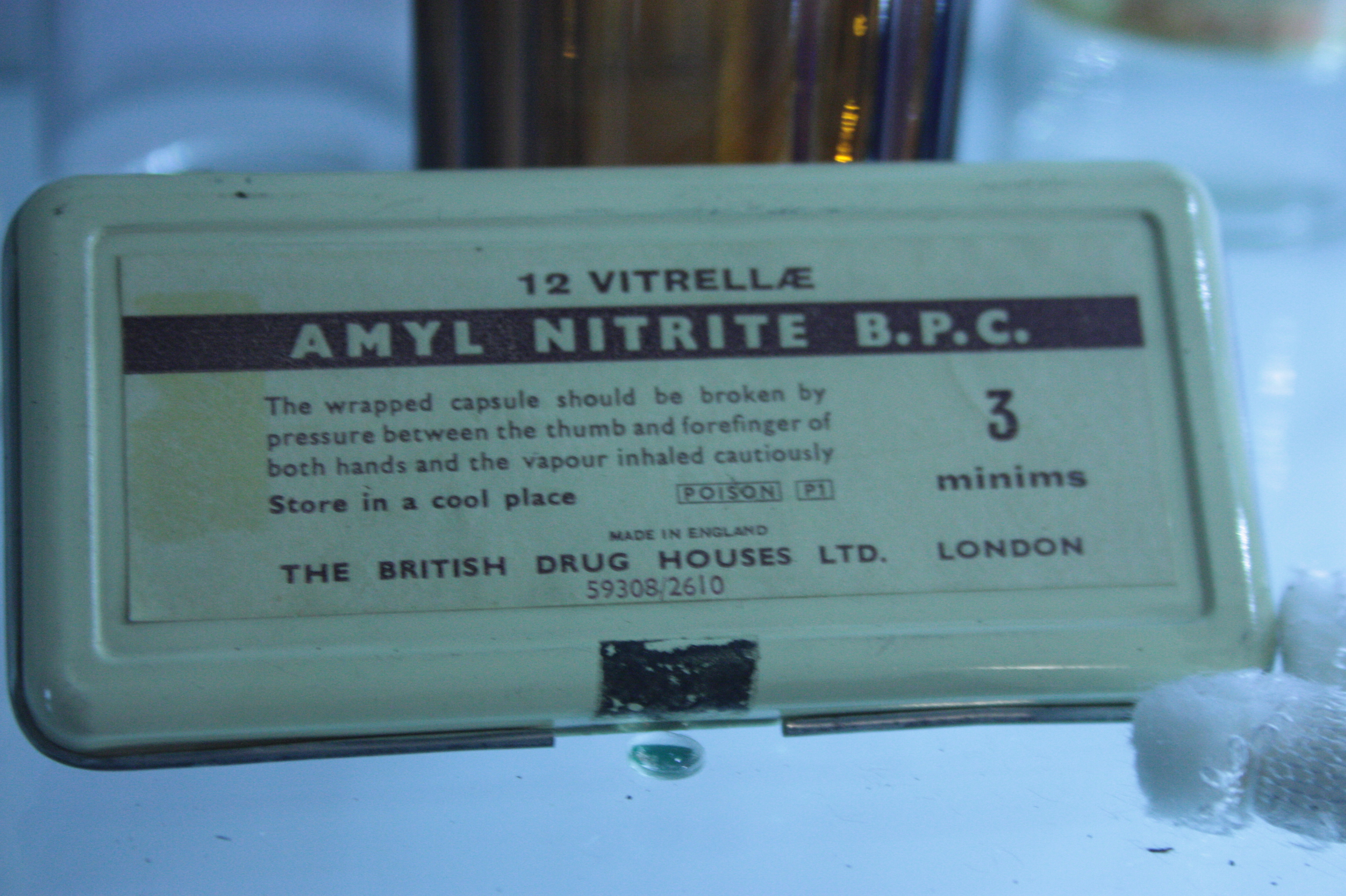
An early container of amyl nitrite, Hunterian Museum, Glasgow

Amyl nitrite, in common with other alkyl nitrites, is a potent vasodilator; it expands blood vessels, resulting in lowering of the blood pressure. Amyl nitrite may be used during cardiovascular stress testing in patients with suspected hypertrophic cardiomyopathy to cause vasodilation and thereby reduce afterload and provoke obstruction of blood flow towards the aorta from the ventricle by increasing the pressure gradient, thereby causing left ventricular outflow obstruction. Alkyl nitrites are a source of nitric oxide, which signals for relaxation of the involuntary muscles. Physical effects include decrease in blood pressure, headache, flushing of the face, increased heart rate, dizziness, and relaxation of involuntary muscles, especially the blood vessel walls and the internal and external anal sphincter. There are no withdrawal symptoms. Overdose symptoms include nausea, vomiting, hypotension, hypoventilation, shortness of breath, and fainting. The effects set in very quickly, typically within a few seconds and disappear within a few minutes. Amyl nitrite may also intensify the experience of synesthesia. Amyl nitrite, when given as a medication for patients with angina, can also be administered as an ampule. The ampule is put in a gauze pad and then inhaled by the patient during an angina attack and repeated every fifteen minutes. However, oral dosing of amyl nitrite is ineffective due to poor absorption and extensive hepatic metabolism. Amyl nitrite has been widely replaced by nitroglycerin for the treatment of acute angina.

== Toxicity ==
There are case reports of life-threatening toxicity involving unusually large amounts. However, there is little evidence that typical inhaled doses of amyl nitrite pose a significant risk, except when combined with drugs used for erectile dysfunction. One study found neurotoxic effects in rats injected with alkyl nitrites, including impairments to memory, learning, and motor coordination, hypothesized to be due to effects on the glutamergic pathway in the hippocampus. Further, liquid amyl nitrite is highly toxic when ingested because of the dangerously high concentration it causes in the blood. Regardless of the form or route of administration, toxicity principally results when the nitrite oxidizes a significant proportion of hemoglobin in the blood without oxygen, forming methemoglobin, which cannot carry oxygen. Severe poisoning cases will progress to methemoglobinemia, characterized by a blue-brown discoloration under the skin which could be mistaken for cyanosis. Treatment with oxygen and intravenous methylene blue frustrates visual confirmation further as methylene blue itself is, as its name suggests, a blue dye; the patient's changes in different shades of blue notwithstanding, it is an effective antidote by way of catalyzing the production of the enzyme responsible for reducing the methemoglobin in the blood back to hemoglobin.

The discoloration does mean that regular near-infrared–based pulse oximetry becomes useless. More fundamentally, blood gas analysis on the whole has limited effectiveness, as the increased methemoglobin level increases the oxygen binding affinity of regular hemoglobin. Therefore, the measurement of actual ratios and levels of methemoglobin and hemoglobin must accompany any blood gas partial pressure sample in these cases.

== In popular culture ==
The Animals frontman Eric Burdon claimed that he inspired the line "I am the eggman" in the Beatles song I Am the Walrus after telling John Lennon about a sensual experience he had with a girlfriend involving a raw egg while Burdon was under influence of amyl nitrite.

The Columbo episode titled "Troubled Waters" (1974–1975) features amyl nitrite inhaled by the antagonist Hayden Danziger – played by Robert Vaughn – to help him feign a heart attack for his alibi. However, the episode consistently refers to the substance incorrectly as amyl nitrate.

The 1978 Derek Jarman film Jubilee features a character credited as "Amyl Nitrite", although in the film itself the character is "Amyl Nitrate".

The 1978 Cheech & Chong film "Up in Smoke" features a character named Jade East- played by Zane Buzby- who, while trying to help Pedro rouse Man from the sofa backstage at the Roxy Theatre says, "I got a popper. We could either, like, you know, party later or try to start his heart."

In the 1986 film Blue Velvet, the character Frank Booth uses the drug.

The title of the 1993 song "Animal Nitrate" by English band Suede is a pun on amyl nitrite, referencing its recreational use, although singer Brett Anderson has said the song has more to do with other drugs like ecstasy and cocaine.

In the 1999 film Fight Club, the character Chloe, a terminally ill woman, mentions having a collection of amyl nitrite while openly discussing her unfulfilled desires at a cancer support group.

The punk band Amyl and the Sniffers reference recreational use of amyl nitrite in their name.

The Hunter S. Thompson book Fear and Loathing in Las Vegas sees amyl nitrite as one of the many drugs Raoul Duke packs for the trip to Las Vegas, taking about two dozen ampules of it with him and usually justifying its usage by him and Dr. Gonzo to other people around them by claiming it is for angina.

On the third season premiere of Arrested Development, "The Cabin Show", Tobias, working as a waiter, offers Michael "a smoothie or an amyl—".

In Season 1, Episode 9 of Bob's Burgers, "Spaghetti Western and Meatballs", Gene guesses amyl nitrite for the A in the ABS program near the end of the episode.

In the movie Diggstown, Charles Macom Diggs is doped in a boxing match with amyl nitrite.
