= Inhalant =

Chemical, often household, breathed in to cause intoxication

Inhalant use
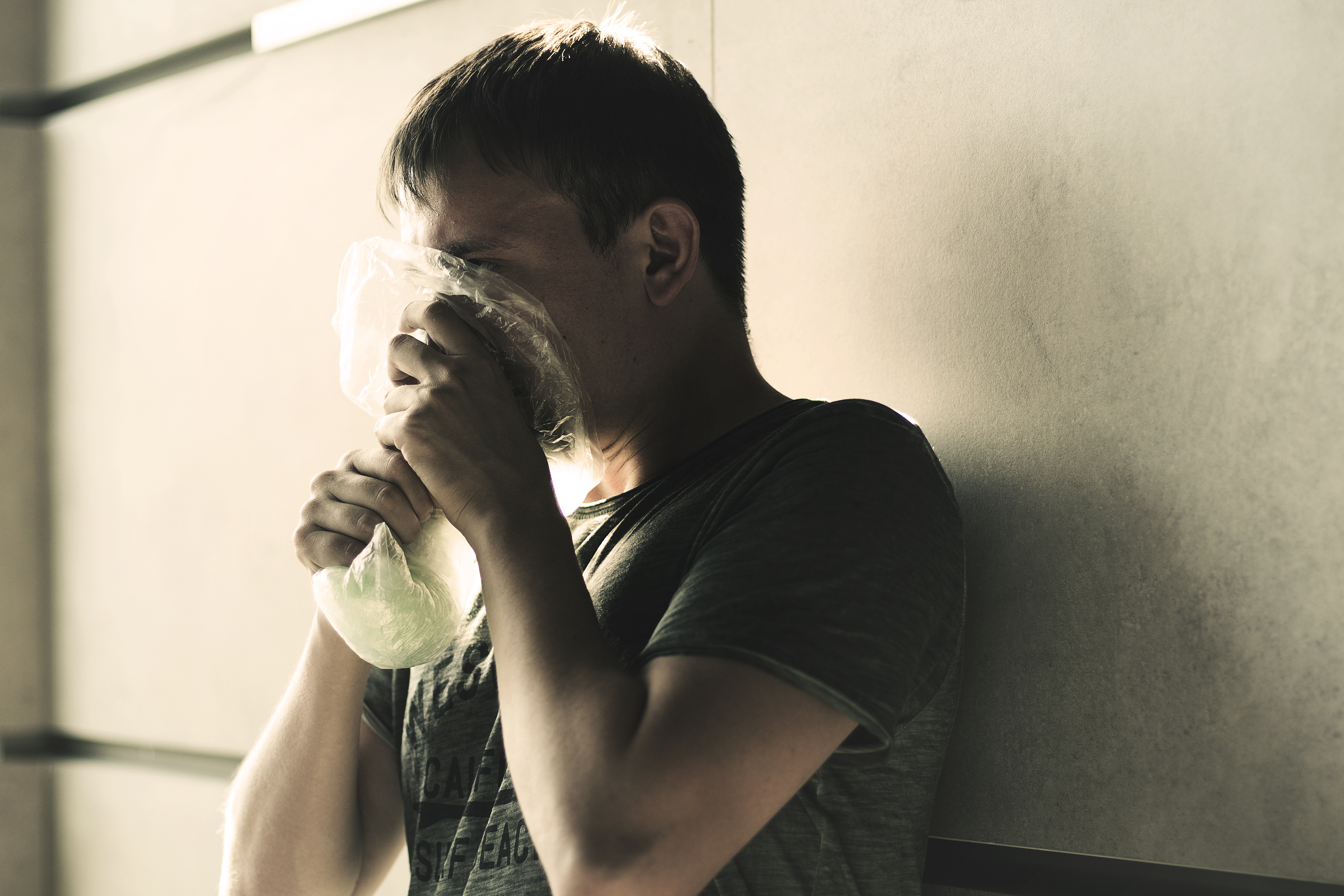
- A man huffing an inhalant
- Specialty: Toxicology, psychiatry
- Complications: General: Suffocation; hypoxia; cerebral hemorrhage; brain damage; hypercapnia; coma; pulmonary aspiration; pneumonia; poisoning Gases: Frostbite; aerosol burns; chemical burns Solvents: Stroke; cancer; cardiac arrest; heart attack
- Differential diagnosis: Alcoholism, inhaled anesthetics, marijuana abuse, tobacco smoking, crack cocaine, methamphetamines, medical inhalants, chasing the dragon

Inhalants are a broad range of household and industrial chemicals whose volatile vapors or pressurized gases can be concentrated and breathed in via the nose or mouth to produce intoxication, in a manner not intended by the manufacturer. They are inhaled at room temperature through volatilization (in the case of gasoline or acetone) or from a pressurized container (e.g., nitrous oxide or butane), and do not include drugs that are sniffed after burning or heating. (Note: For example, amyl nitrite (poppers), gasoline, nitrous oxide and toluene – a solvent widely used in contact cement, permanent markers, and certain types of glue – are considered inhalants, but smoking tobacco, cannabis, and crack cocaine are not, even though these drugs are inhaled as smoke or vapor.)

While a few inhalants are prescribed by medical professionals and used for medical purposes, as in the case of inhaled anesthetics and nitrous oxide (an anxiolytic and pain relief agent prescribed by dentists), this article focuses on inhalant use of household and industrial propellants, glues, fuels, and other products in a manner not intended by the manufacturer, to produce intoxication or other psychoactive effects. These products are used as recreational drugs for their intoxicating effect. According to a 1995 report by the National Institute on Drug Abuse, the most serious inhalant use occurs among homeless children and teenagers who "live on the streets completely without family ties." Inhalants are the only substance used more by younger teenagers than by older teenagers. Inhalant users inhale vapor or aerosol propellant gases using plastic bags held over the mouth or by breathing from a solvent-soaked rag or an open container. The practices are known colloquially as "sniffing", "huffing" or "bagging".

The effects of inhalants range from an alcohol-like intoxication and intense euphoria to vivid hallucinations, depending on the substance and the dose. Some inhalant users are injured due to the harmful effects of the solvents or gases or due to other chemicals used in the products that they are inhaling. As with any recreational drug, users can be injured due to dangerous behavior while they are intoxicated, such as driving under the influence. In some cases, users have died from hypoxia (lack of oxygen), pneumonia, heart failure, cardiac arrest, or aspiration of vomit. Brain damage is typically seen with chronic long-term use of solvents as opposed to short-term exposure.

While legal when used as intended, in England, Scotland, and Wales it is illegal to sell inhalants to persons likely to use them as an intoxicant. As of 2017, 37 US states impose criminal penalties on some combination of sale, possession or recreational use of various inhalants. In 15 of these states, such laws apply only to persons under the age of 18.

== Categories ==
Safety	Category	Sub category	Psychoactive effect	ICD-10	Examples	Example image
Medical	Nitrites		Dissociative	T65.3; T65.5	Alkyl nitrites (poppers such as amyl nitrite)	
Medical	Nitrous oxide		Dissociative	T59.0	Nitrous oxide (found in whipped cream canisters)	
Medical (historical)	Haloalkanes		Depressant	T53	Hydrofluorocarbons, chlorofluorocarbons (including many aerosols and propellants), chloroethanes (chloroethane, 1,1,1-Trichloroethane), trichloroethylene, chloroform (the latter two being antiquated inhalational anaesthetics)	
Toxic	Hydrocarbons	Aliphatic hydrocarbons	Dissociative	T52.0	Petroleum products (gasoline and kerosene), propane, butane	
Toxic	Hydrocarbons	Aromatic hydrocarbons	Dissociative	T52.1; T52.2	Toluene (used in paint thinner and model glue), xylene	
Toxic	Ketones		Depressant	T52.4	Acetone (used in nail polish remover)	

== Medical inhalants ==
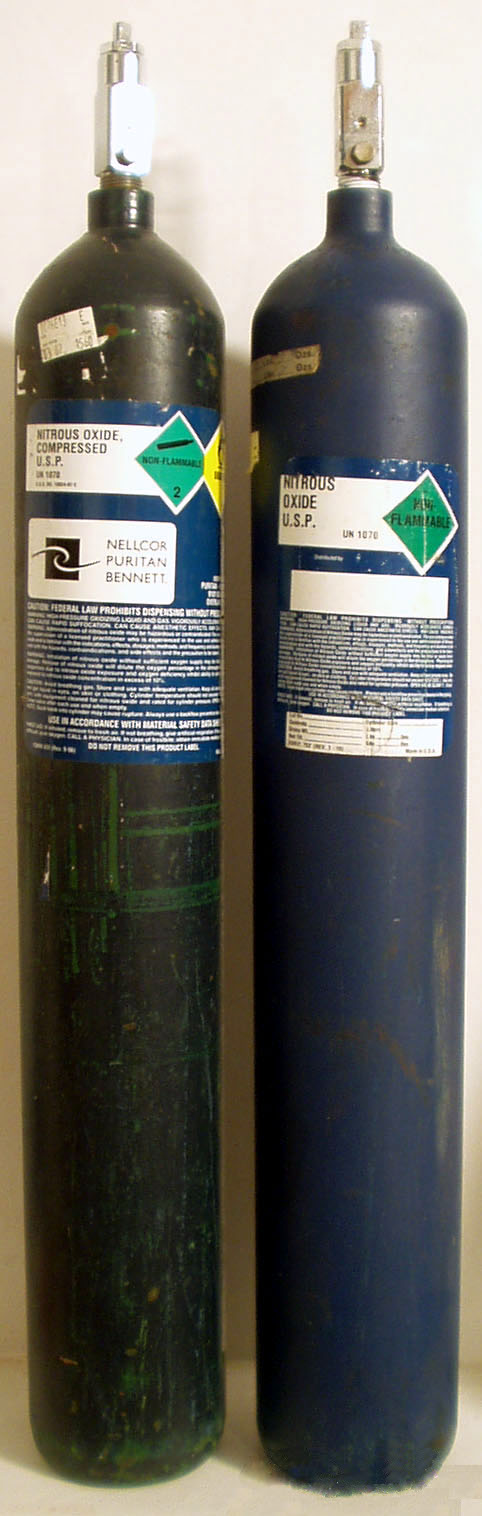
Tanks of medical-grade nitrous oxide

A small number of recreational inhalant drugs are pharmaceutical products that are used illicitly.

- Antidote to cyanide poisoning
  - Alkyl nitrites (poppers)
- Inhalational anesthetics used as general anesthetics
  - Nitrous oxide
  - Xenon
- Historical general anesthetics
  - Chloroethane
  - Chloroform
  - Ether

Medical anesthetics that have been used as recreational drugs include diethyl ether (no longer used medically due to high flammability and development of safer alternatives) and nitrous oxide, widely used since the late 20th century by dentists as an anti-anxiety drug and mild anesthetic during dental procedures. The effects of ether intoxication are similar to those of alcohol intoxication, but more potent. Also, due to NMDA antagonism, the user may experience all the psychedelic effects present in classical dissociatives such as ketamine in the forms of thought loops and the feeling of the mind being disconnected from one's body. Nitrous oxide is a dental anesthetic that is used as a recreational drug, either by users who have access to medical-grade gas canisters (e.g., dental hygienists or dentists) or by using the gas contained in whipped cream aerosol containers. Nitrous oxide inhalation can cause pain relief, depersonalization, derealization, dizziness, euphoria, and some sound distortion.

=== Recreational use ===
==== Liquids ====
===== Alkyl nitrites =====
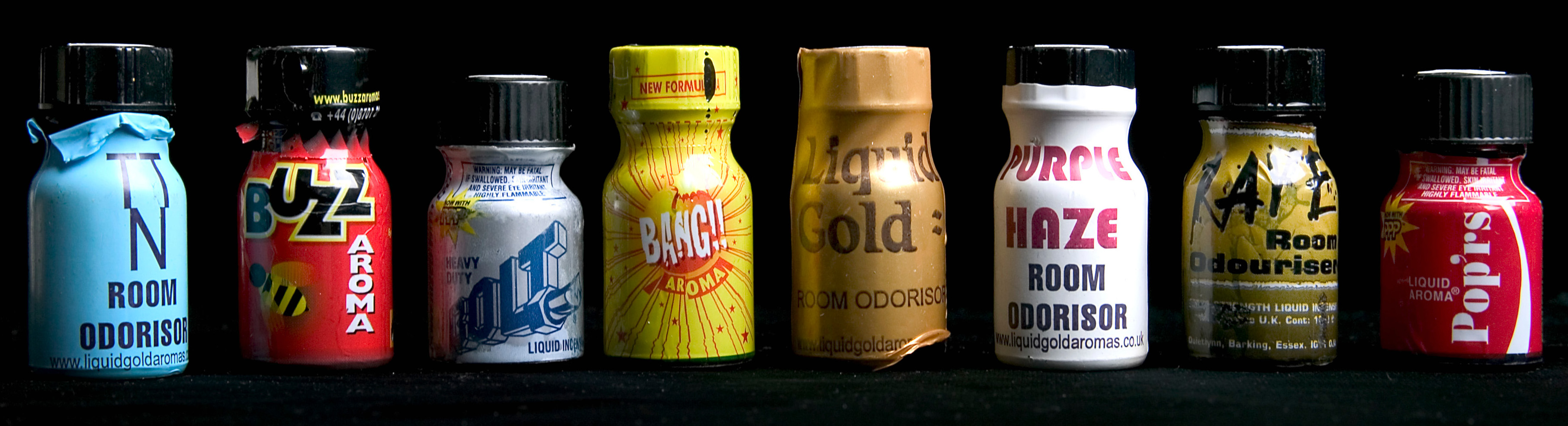
A selection of poppers

Ingestion of alkyl nitrites can cause methemoglobinemia, and by inhalation it has not been ruled out.

The sale of alkyl nitrite-based poppers was banned in Canada in 2013. Although not considered a narcotic and not illegal to possess or use, they are considered a drug. Sales that are not authorized can now be punished with fines and prison. Since 2007, reformulated poppers containing isopropyl nitrite are sold in Europe because only isobutyl nitrite is prohibited. In France, the sale of products containing butyl nitrite, pentyl nitrite, or isomers thereof, has been prohibited since 1990 on grounds of danger to consumers. In 2007, the government extended this prohibition to all alkyl nitrites that were not authorized for sale as drugs. After litigation by sex shop owners, this extension was quashed by the Council of State on the grounds that the government had failed to justify such a blanket prohibition: according to the court, the risks cited, concerning rare accidents often following abnormal usage, rather justified compulsory warnings on the packaging.

In the United Kingdom, poppers are widely available and frequently (legally) sold in gay clubs/bars, sex shops, drug paraphernalia head shops, over the Internet and on markets. It is illegal under Medicines Act 1968 to sell them advertised for human consumption, and to bypass this, they are usually sold as odorizers. In the U.S., originally marketed as a prescription drug in 1937, amyl nitrite remained so until 1960, when the Food and Drug Administration removed the prescription requirement due to its safety record. This requirement was reinstated in 1969, after observation of an increase in recreational use. Other alkyl nitrites were outlawed in the U.S. by Congress through the Anti-Drug Abuse Act of 1988. The law includes an exception for commercial purposes. The term commercial purpose is defined to mean any use other than for the production of consumer products containing volatile alkyl nitrites meant for inhaling or otherwise introducing volatile alkyl nitrites into the human body for euphoric or physical effects. The law came into effect in 1990. Visits to retail outlets selling these products reveal that some manufacturers have since reformulated their products to abide by the regulations, through the use of the legal cyclohexyl nitrite as the primary ingredient in their products, which are sold as video head cleaners, polish removers, or room odorants.

==== Gases ====
===== Nitrous oxide =====
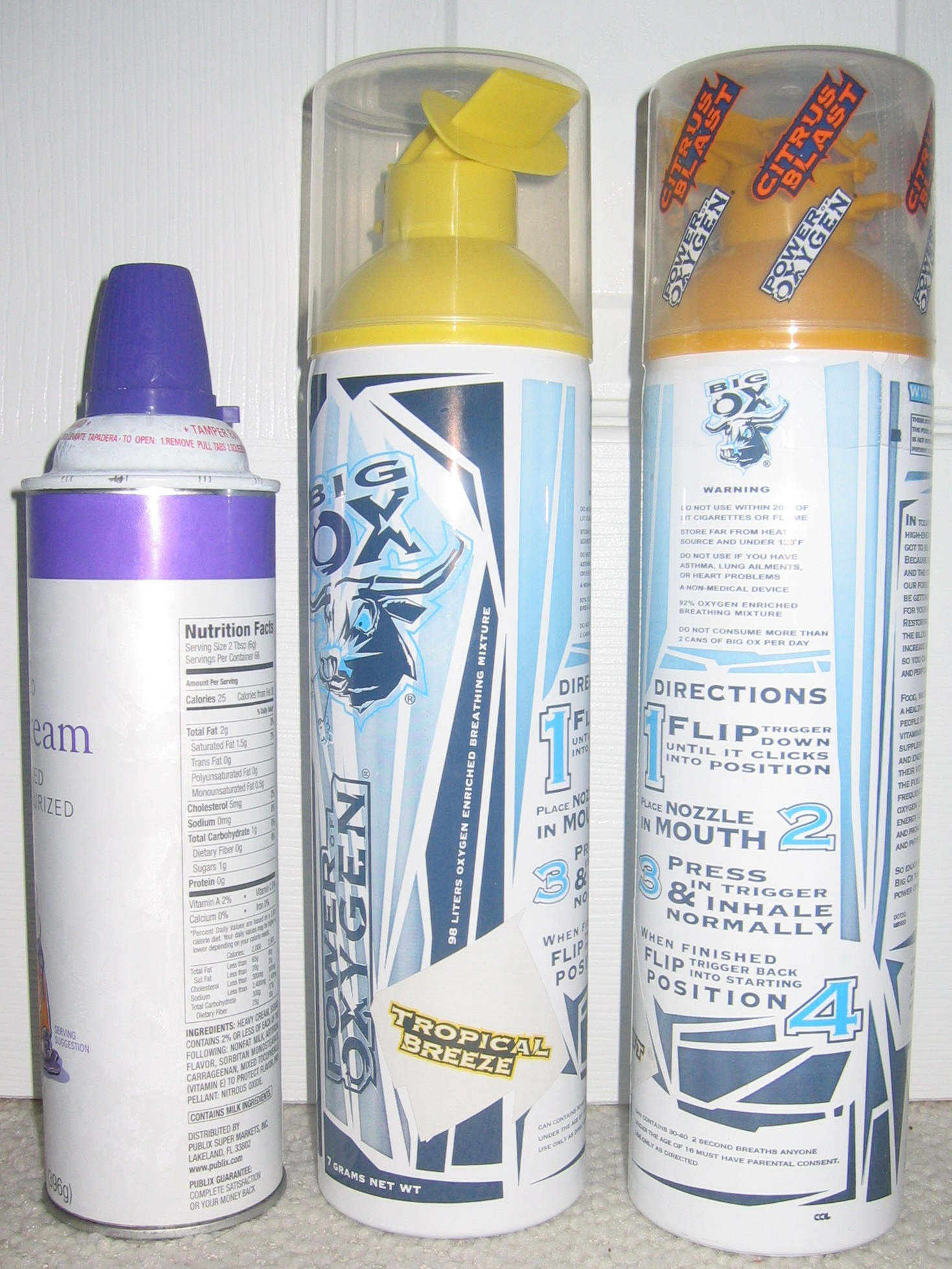
The canister on the left is whipped cream, a product which is pressurized with nitrous oxide. The two canisters on the right contain 'flavoured' oxygen.

Nitrous oxide can be categorized as a dissociative drug, as it can cause visual and auditory hallucinations. Anesthetic gases used for surgery, such as nitrous oxide or enflurane, are believed to induce anesthesia primarily by acting as NMDA receptor antagonists, open-channel blockers that bind to the inside of the calcium channels on the outer surface of the neuron, and provide high levels of NMDA receptor blockade for a short period of time.

This makes inhaled anesthetic gases different from other NMDA antagonists, such as ketamine, which bind to a regulatory site on the NMDA-sensitive calcium transporter complex and provide slightly lower levels of NMDA blockade, but for a longer and much more predictable duration. This makes a deeper level of anesthesia achievable more easily using anesthetic gases but can also make them more dangerous than other drugs used for this purpose. Nitrous oxide is thought to be particularly non-toxic, though heavy long-term use can lead to a variety of serious health problems linked to the destruction of vitamin B12 and folic acid.

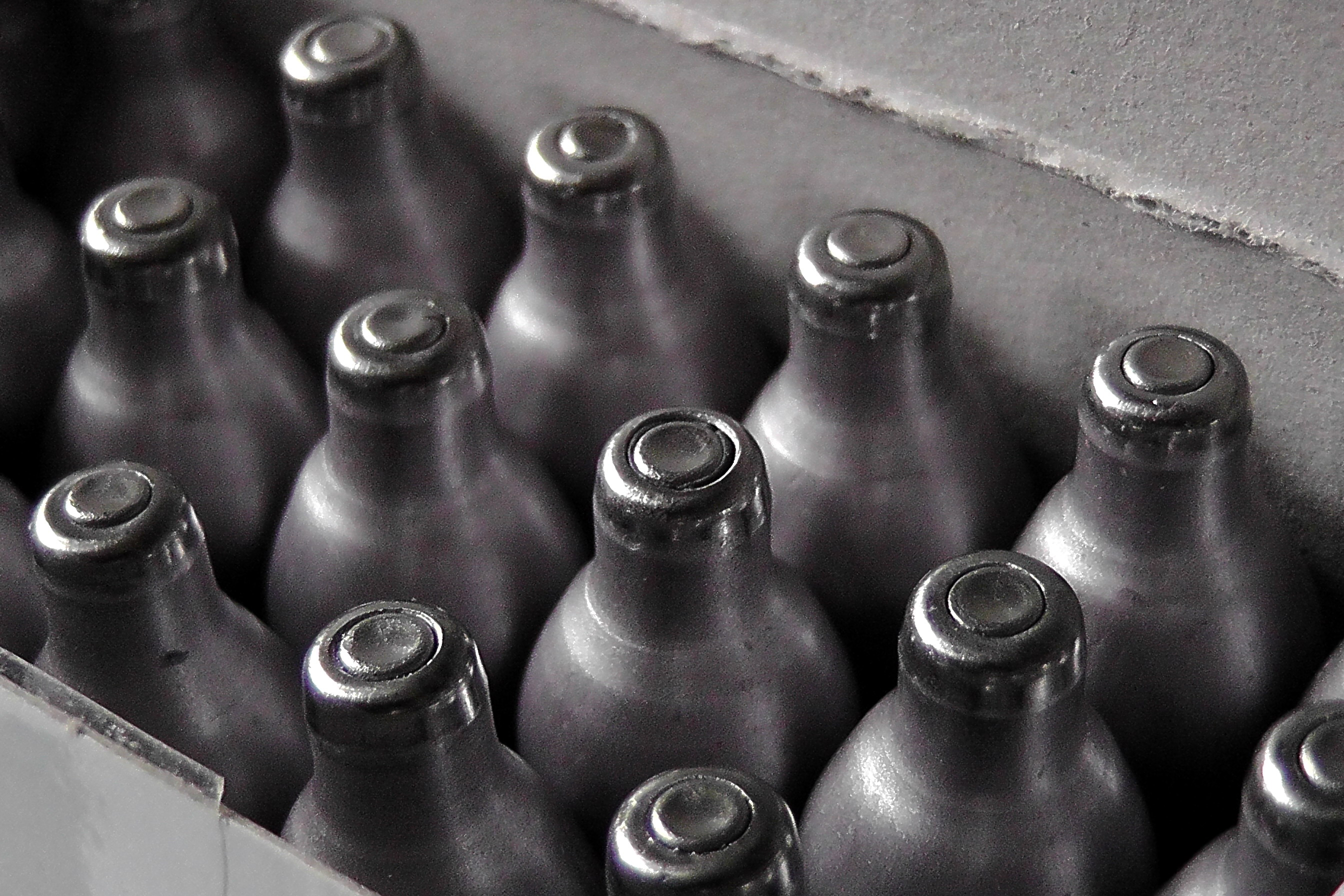
Nitrous oxide "whippets" are small aerosol containers designed for charging whipped cream dispensers.

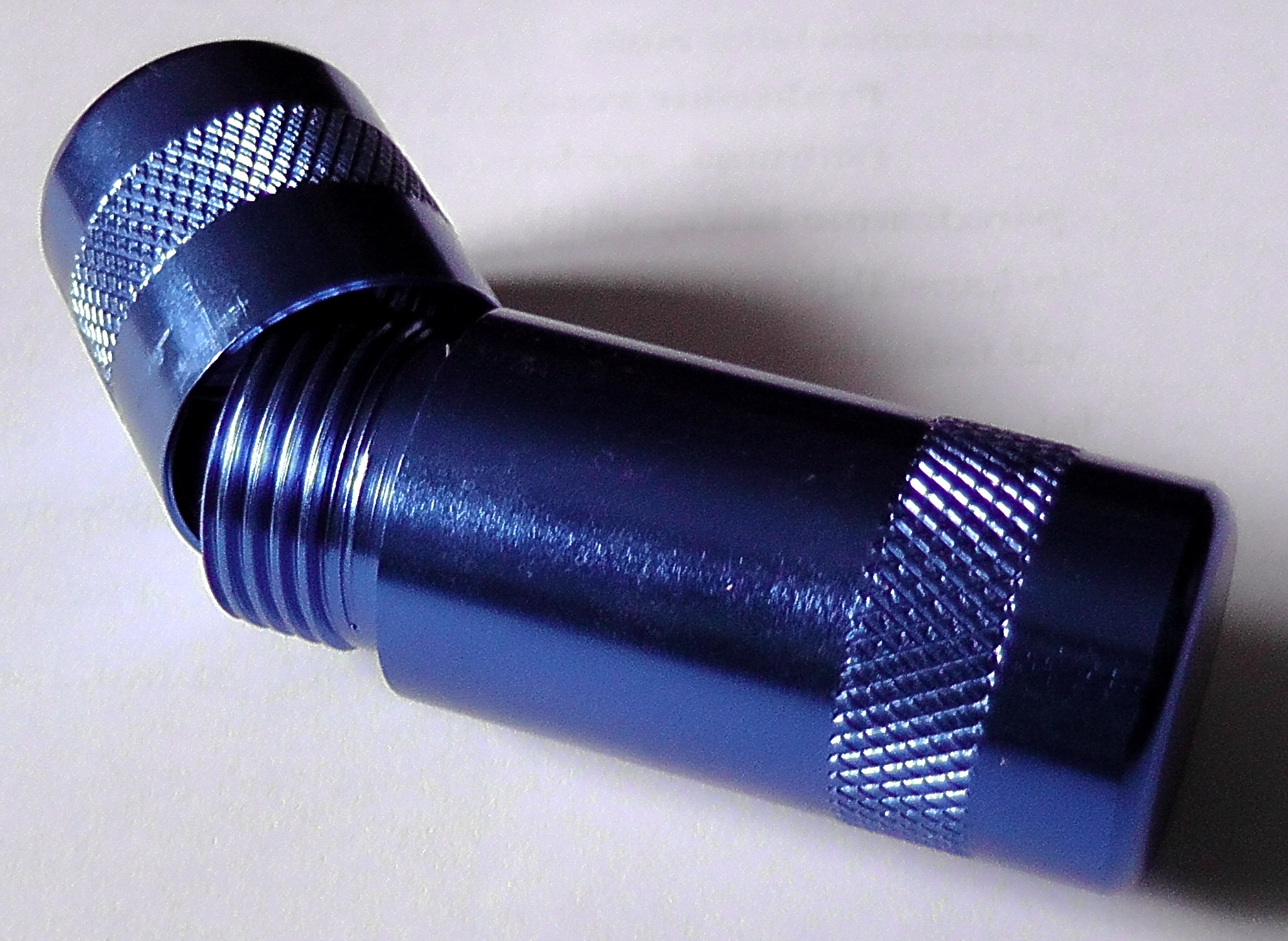
A nitrous oxide "cracker" device, for releasing the gas from whipped cream aerosol chargers

In the United States, possession of nitrous oxide is legal under federal law and is not subject to DEA purview. It is, however, regulated by the Food and Drug Administration under the Food Drug and Cosmetics Act; prosecution is possible under its "misbranding" clauses, prohibiting the sale or distribution of nitrous oxide for the purpose of human consumption as a recreational drug. Many states have laws regulating the possession, sale, and distribution of nitrous oxide. Such laws usually ban distribution to minors or limit the amount of nitrous oxide that may be sold without a special license. For example, in the state of California, possession for recreational use is prohibited and qualifies as a misdemeanor. In New Zealand, the Ministry of Health has warned that nitrous oxide is a prescription medicine, and its sale or possession without a prescription is an offense under the Medicines Act. This statement would seemingly prohibit all non-medicinal uses of the chemical, though it is implied that only recreational use will be legally targeted. In India, for general anesthesia purposes, nitrous oxide is available as Nitrous Oxide IP. India's gas cylinder rules (1985) prohibit the transfer of gas from one cylinder to another for breathing purposes. Because India's Food & Drug Authority (FDA-India) rules state that transferring a drug from one container to another (refilling) is equivalent to manufacturing, anyone found doing so must possess a drug manufacturing license.

==== Safety ====
In contrast, a few inhalants like amyl nitrite and diethyl ether have medical applications and are not toxic in the same sense as solvents, though they can still be dangerous when used recreationally.

== Non-medical inhalants ==
Ethanol (the alcohol which is normally drunk) is sometimes inhaled.

The ethanol must be converted from liquid into gaseous state (vapor) or aerosol (mist), in some cases using a nebulizer, a machine that agitates the liquid into an aerosol. The sale of nebulizers for inhaling ethanol was banned in some US states due to safety concerns.

== Toxic inhalants ==
Most inhalant drugs that are used non-medically are ingredients in household or industrial chemical products that are not intended to be concentrated and inhaled.

- Hydrocarbon poisoning
  - Gases
    - Butane
    - Propane
  - Solvents
    - Gasoline/petrol
    - Toluene
  - Liquid/gas mixtures
    - Freon
- Ketones
  - Solvents
    - Acetone

=== Solvents ===
Solvents
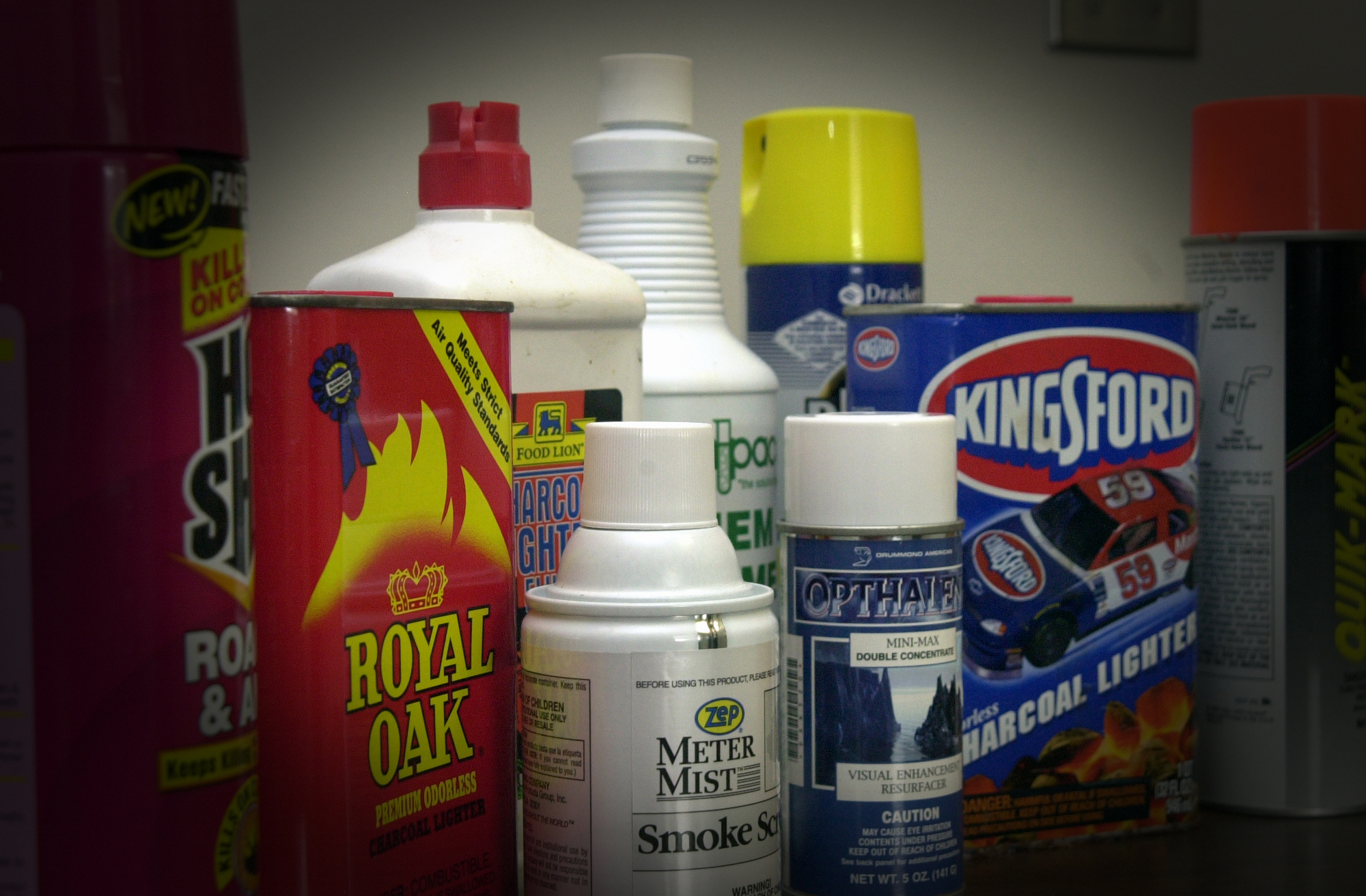
A range of petroleum-based products that can be used as inhalants

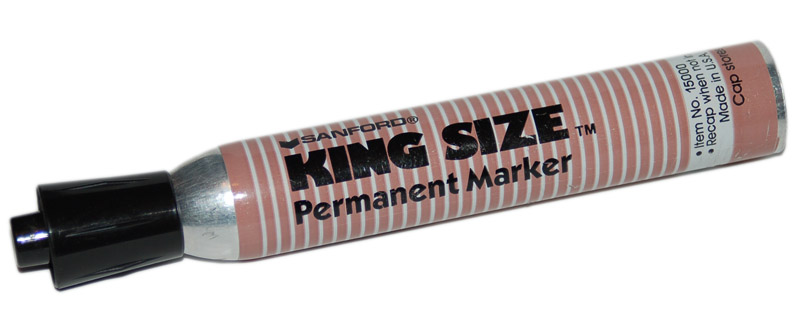
Permanent markers have the potential to be inhalants.

A wide range of volatile solvents intended for household or industrial use are inhaled as recreational drugs. This includes petroleum products (gasoline and kerosene), toluene (used in paint thinner, permanent markers, contact cement and model glue), and acetone (used in nail polish remover). These solvents vaporize at room temperature.

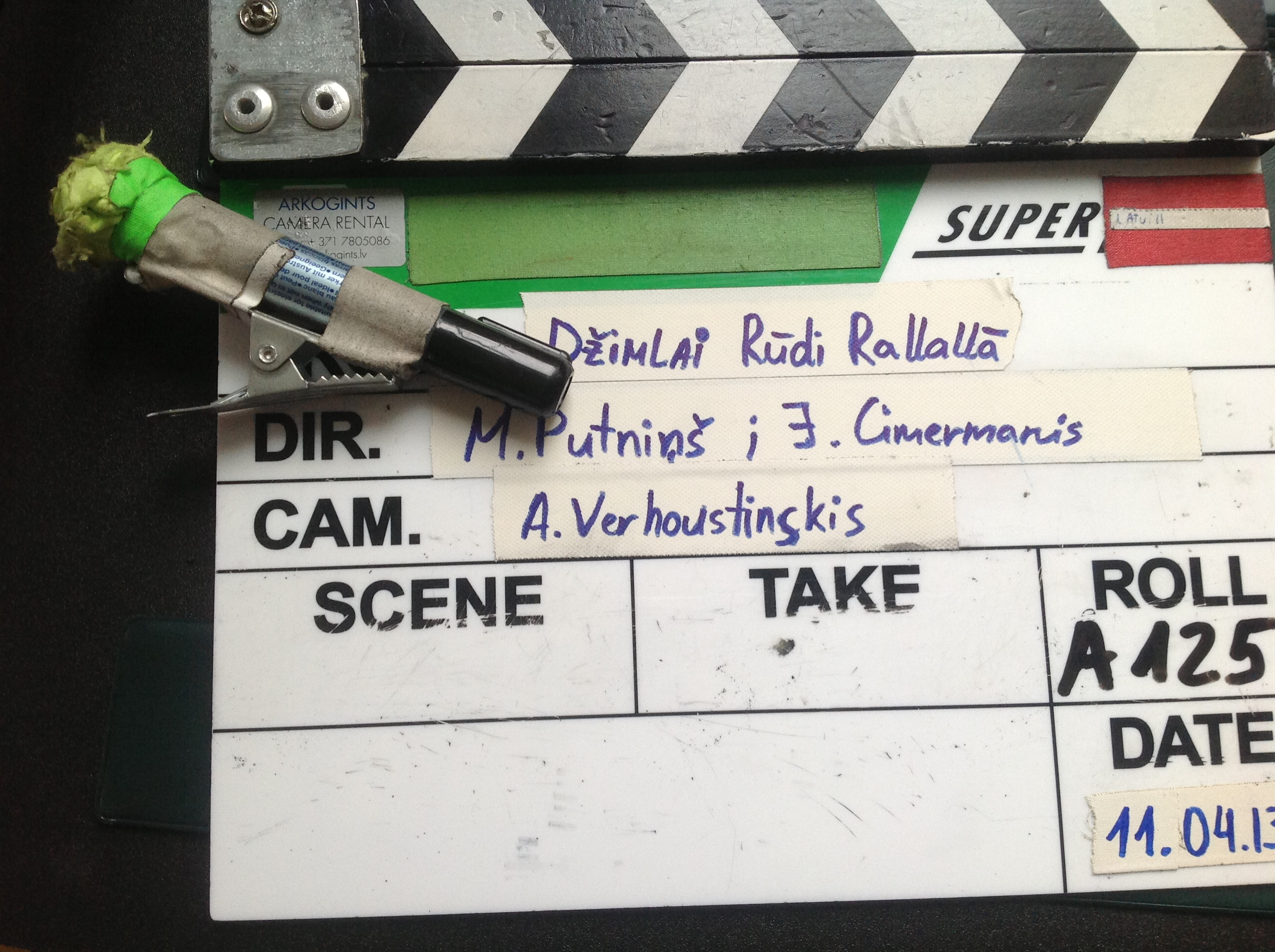
Whiteboard marker on a clapperboard

Until the early 1990s, the most common solvents that were used for the ink in permanent markers were toluene and xylene. These two substances are both harmful and characterized by a very strong smell. Today, the ink is usually made on the basis of alcohols (e.g. 1-Propanol, 1-butanol, diacetone alcohol and cresols).

Organochlorine solvents are particularly hazardous; many of these are now restricted in developed countries due to their environmental impact.

==== Legality ====
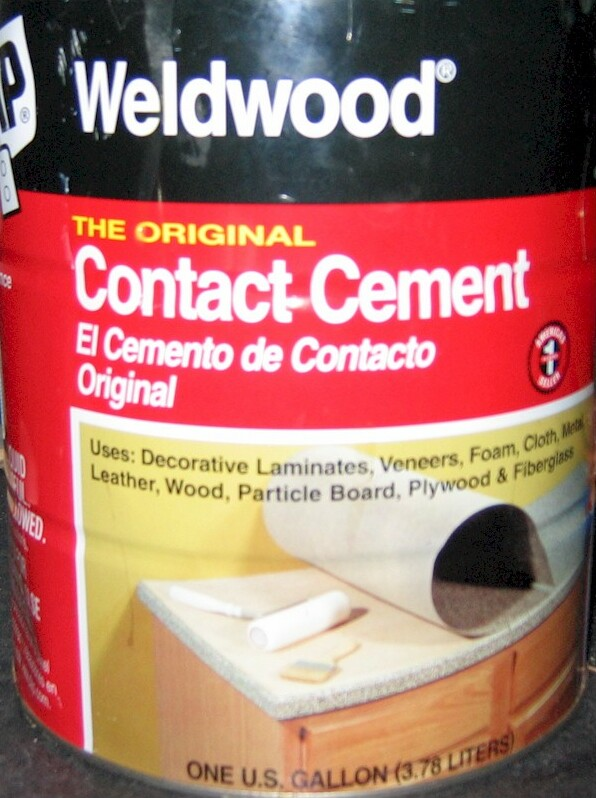
Contact cement, a fast-drying glue, is widely used as an inhalant, as it typically contains solvents such as toluene which vaporize at room temperature.

Even though solvent glue is normally a legal product, there is a 1983 case where a court ruled that supplying glue to children is illegal. Khaliq v HM Advocate was a Scottish criminal case decided by the High Court of Justiciary on appeal, in which it was decided that it was an offense at common law to supply glue-sniffing materials that were otherwise legal in the knowledge that they would be used recreationally by children. Two shopkeepers in Glasgow were arrested and charged for supplying children with "glue-sniffing kits" consisting of a quantity of petroleum-based glue in a plastic bag. They argued there was nothing illegal about the items that they had supplied. On appeal, the High Court took the view that, even though glue and plastic bags might be perfectly legal, everyday items, the two shopkeepers knew perfectly well that the children were going to use the articles as inhalants and the charge on the indictment should stand. When the case came to trial at Glasgow High Court the two were sentenced to three years' imprisonment.

As of 2023, in England, Scotland, and Wales it is illegal to sell inhalants, including solvent glues, to persons of any age likely to use them as an intoxicant. As of 2017, thirty-seven US states impose criminal penalties on some combination of sale, possession or recreational use of various inhalants. In 15 of these states, such laws apply only to persons under the age of 18.

==== Gasoline ====
Gasoline sniffing can cause lead poisoning, in locations where leaded gas is not banned.

==== Toluene ====
Toluene can damage myelin.

=== Gases ===
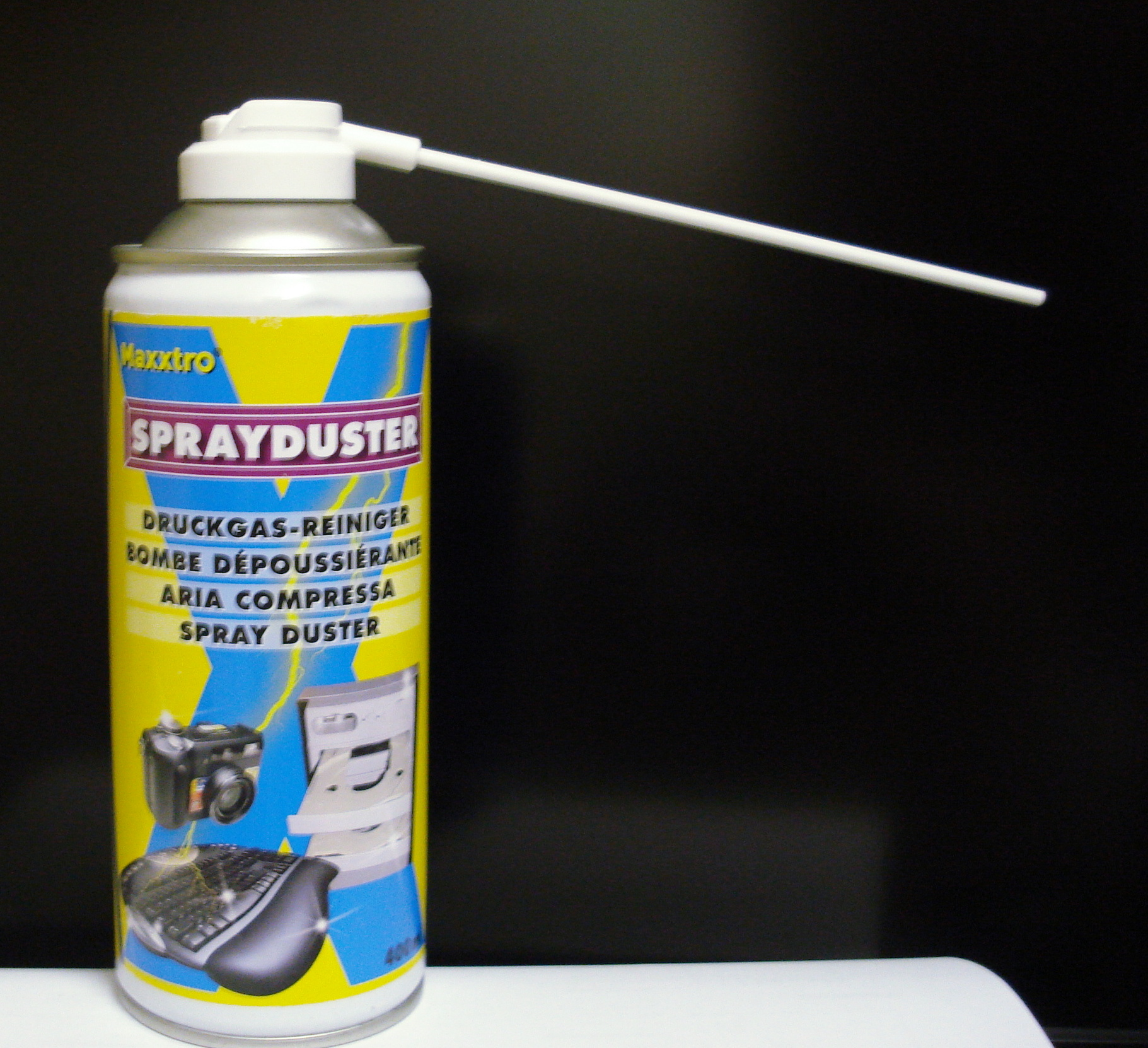
Computer-cleaning dusters are dangerous to inhale because the gases expand and cool rapidly upon being sprayed.

A number of gases intended for household or industrial use are inhaled as recreational drugs. This includes chlorofluorocarbons used in aerosols and propellants (e.g., aerosol hair spray, aerosol deodorant). A gas used as a propellant in whipped cream aerosol containers, nitrous oxide, is used as a recreational drug. Pressurized canisters of propane and butane gas, both of which are intended for use as fuels, are used as inhalants.

==== Legality ====
"New Jersey... prohibits selling or offering to sell minors products containing chlorofluorocarbon that is used in refrigerant."

=== Dangers ===
Statistics on deaths caused by heavy inhalant use are difficult to determine. It may be severely under-reported because death is often attributed to a discrete event such as a stroke or a heart attack, even if the event happened because of inhalant use. Inhalant use was mentioned on 144 death certificates in Texas during the period 1988–1998 and was reported in 39 deaths in Virginia between 1987 and 1996 from acute voluntary exposure to used inhalants.

==== Chronic solvent-induced encephalopathy ====
Chronic solvent-induced encephalopathy (CSE) is a condition induced by long-term exposure to organic solvents, often—but not always—in the workplace, that lead to a wide variety of persisting sensorimotor polyneuropathies and neurobehavioral deficits even after solvent exposure has been removed.

==== Sudden sniffing death syndrome ====
Sudden sniffing death syndrome, first described by Millard Bass in 1970, is commonly known as SSDS.

Solvents have many potential risks in common, including pneumonia, cardiac failure or arrest, and aspiration of vomit. The inhaling of some solvents can cause hearing loss, limb spasms, and damage to the central nervous system and brain. Serious but potentially reversible effects include liver and kidney damage and blood-oxygen depletion. Death from inhalants is generally caused by a very high concentration of fumes. Deliberately inhaling solvents from an attached paper or plastic bag or in a closed area greatly increases the chances of suffocation. Brain damage is typically seen with chronic long-term use as opposed to short-term exposure. Parkinsonism (see: Signs and symptoms of Parkinson's disease) has been associated with huffing.

Female inhalant users who are pregnant may have adverse effects on the fetus, and the baby may be smaller when it is born and may need additional health care (similar to those seen with alcohol – fetal alcohol syndrome). There is some evidence of birth defects and disabilities in babies born to women who sniffed solvents such as gasoline.

Inhaling butane gas can cause drowsiness, unconsciousness, asphyxia, and cardiac arrhythmia. Butane is the most commonly misused volatile solvent in the UK and caused 52% of solvent-related deaths in 2000. When butane is sprayed directly into the throat, the jet of fluid can cool rapidly to −20 °C by adiabatic expansion, causing prolonged laryngospasm.

Some inhalants can also indirectly cause sudden death by cardiac arrest, in a syndrome known as "sudden sniffing death". The anaesthetic gases present in the inhalants appear to sensitize the user to adrenaline and, in this state, a sudden surge of adrenaline (e.g., from a frightening hallucination or run-in with aggressors), may cause fatal cardiac arrhythmia.

Furthermore, the inhalation of any gas that is capable of displacing oxygen in the lungs (especially gases heavier than oxygen) carries the risk of hypoxia as a result of the very mechanism by which breathing is triggered. Since reflexive breathing is prompted by elevated carbon dioxide levels (rather than diminished blood oxygen levels), breathing a concentrated, relatively inert gas (such as computer-duster tetrafluoroethane, helium or nitrous oxide) that removes carbon dioxide from the blood without replacing it with oxygen will produce no outward signs of suffocation even when the brain is experiencing hypoxia. Once full symptoms of hypoxia appear, it may be too late to breathe without assistance, especially if the gas is heavy enough to lodge in the lungs for extended periods. Even completely inert gases, such as argon, can have this effect if oxygen is largely excluded.

=== Patterns of use ===
Inhalant drugs are often used by children, teenagers, incarcerated or institutionalized people, and impoverished people, because these solvents and gases are ingredients in hundreds of legally available, inexpensive products, such as deodorant sprays, hair spray, contact cement and aerosol air fresheners. However, most users tend to be "... adolescents (between the ages of 12 and 17)." (Note: For example, studies on inhalant use in New Zealand showed that "... most of the inhalant abusers are within the 14- to 18-year-old age group"; in the Philippines, the mean age of sniffers was 15; in Korea, a 1992 study showed "86 percent are male and are below the age of 20"; about 3/4 of Singapore inhalant users in a 1987 study were 19 or younger.) In some countries, chronic, heavy inhalant use is concentrated in marginalized, impoverished communities. (Note: Native children in Canada's isolated Northern Labrador community of Davis Inlet were the focus of national concern in 1993 when many were found to be sniffing gasoline. The federal Canadian and provincial Newfoundland and Labrador governments intervened on a number of occasions, sending many children away for treatment. Despite being moved to the new community of Natuashish in 2002, serious inhalant use problems have continued. Similar problems were also reported in Sheshatshiu in 2000.) Young people who become used to heavy amounts of inhalants chronically are also more likely to be those who are isolated from their families and community. The article "Epidemiology of Inhalant Abuse: An International Perspective" notes that "[t]he most serious form of obsession with inhalant use probably occurs in countries other than the United States where young children live on the streets completely without family ties. These groups almost always use inhalants at very high levels (Leal et al. 1978). This isolation can make it harder to keep in touch with the sniffer and encourage him or her to stop sniffing."

The article also states that "... high [inhalant use] rates among barrio Hispanics almost undoubtedly are related to the poverty, lack of opportunity, and social dysfunction that occur in barrios" and states that the "... same general tendency appears for Native-American youth" because "... Indian reservations are among the most disadvantaged environments in the United States; there are high rates of unemployment, little opportunity, and high rates of alcoholism and other health problems." There are a wide range of social problems associated with inhalant use, such as feelings of distress, anxiety and grief for the community; violence and damage to property; violent crime; stresses on the juvenile justice system; and stresses on youth agencies and support services.

==== Africa and Asia ====
Glue and gasoline (petrol) sniffing is also a problem in parts of Africa, especially with street children. In India and South Asia, three of the most widely used inhalants are the Dendrite brand and other forms of contact adhesives and rubber cement manufactured in Kolkata, and toluene in paint thinners. Genkem is a brand of glue, which had become the generic name for all the glues used by glue-sniffing children in Africa before the manufacturer replaced n-hexane in its ingredients in 2000.

Similar incidents of glue sniffing among destitute youth in the Philippines have also been reported, most commonly from groups of street children and teenagers collectively known as "Rugby" boys, which were named after a brand of toluene-laden contact cement. Other toluene-containing substances have also been used, most notably the Vulca Seal brand of roof sealants. Bostik Philippines, which currently owns the Rugby and Vulca Seal brands, has since responded to the issue by adding bitterants such as mustard oil to their Rugby line, as well as reformulating it by replacing toluene with xylene. Several other manufacturers have also followed suit.

Another very common inhalant is Erase-X, a correction fluid that contains toluene. It has become very common for school and college students to use it, because it is easily available in stationery shops in India. This fluid is also used by street and working children in Delhi.

==== Europe and North America ====
In the UK, marginalized youth use a number of inhalants, such as solvents and propellants. In Russia and Eastern Europe, gasoline sniffing became common on Russian ships following attempts to limit the supply of alcohol to ship crews in the 1980s. The documentary Children Underground depicts the huffing of a solvent called Aurolac (a product used in chroming) by Romanian homeless children. During the interwar period, the inhalation of ether (etheromania) was widespread in some regions of Poland, especially in Upper Silesia. Tens of thousands of people were affected by this problem.

In Canada, Native children in the isolated Northern Labrador community of Davis Inlet were the focus of national concern in 1993, when many were found to be sniffing gasoline. The Canadian and provincial Newfoundland and Labrador governments intervened on a number of occasions, sending many children away for treatment. Despite being moved to the new community of Natuashish in 2002, serious inhalant use problems have continued. Similar problems were reported in Sheshatshiu in 2000 and also in Pikangikum First Nation. In 2012, the issue once again made the news media in Canada. In Mexico, the inhaling of a mixture of gasoline and industrial solvents, known locally as "Activo" or "Chemo", has risen in popularity among the homeless and among the street children of Mexico City in the 21st century. The mixture is poured onto a handkerchief and inhaled while held in one's fist.

In the US, ether was used as a recreational drug during the 1930s Prohibition era, when alcohol was made illegal. Ether was either sniffed or drunk and, in some towns, replaced alcohol entirely. However, the risk of death from excessive sedation or overdose is greater than that with alcohol, and ether drinking is associated with damage to the stomach and gastrointestinal tract. Use of glue, paint and gasoline became more common after the 1950s. Model airplane glue-sniffing as problematic behavior among youth was first reported in 1959 and increased in the 1960s. Use of aerosol sprays became more common in the 1980s, as older propellants such as CFCs were phased out and replaced by more environmentally friendly compounds such as propane and butane. Most inhalant solvents and gases are not regulated under drug laws such as the United States Controlled Substances Act. However, many US states and Canadian cities have placed restrictions on the sale of some solvent-containing products to minors, particularly for products widely associated with sniffing, such as model cement. The practice of inhaling such substances is sometimes colloquially referred to as huffing, sniffing (or glue sniffing), dusting, or chroming.

==== Australia ====
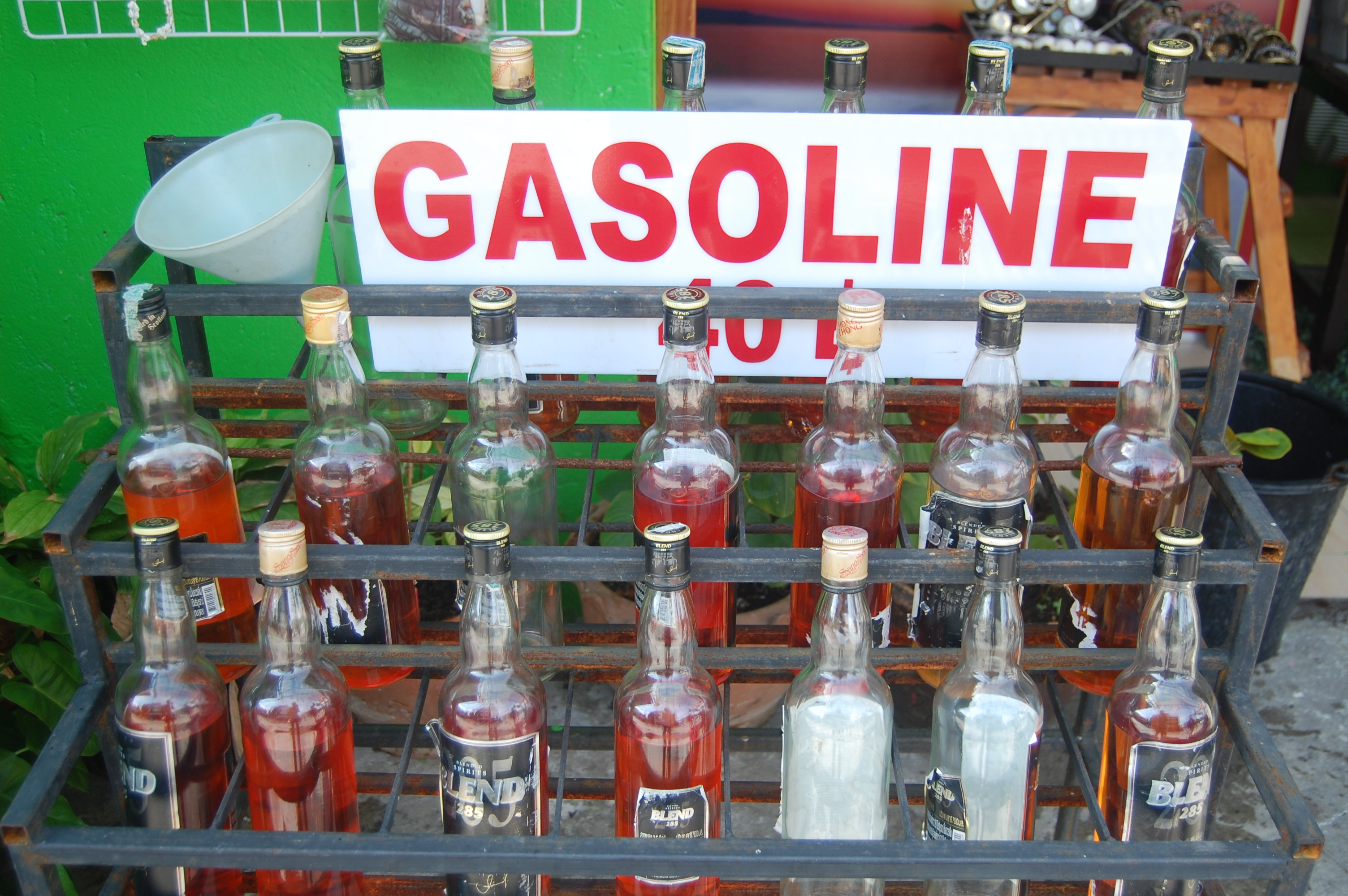
Gasoline (also known as petrol) is used as an inhalant in impoverished communities.

Australia has long faced a petrol (gasoline) sniffing problem in isolated and impoverished aboriginal communities. Although some sources argue that sniffing was introduced by United States servicemen stationed in the nation's Top End during World War II or through experimentation by 1940s-era Cobourg Peninsula sawmill workers, other sources claim that inhalant abuse (such as glue inhalation) emerged in Australia in the late 1960s. Chronic, heavy petrol sniffing appears to occur among remote, impoverished indigenous communities, where the ready accessibility of petrol has helped to make it a common addictive substance.

In Australia, petrol sniffing now occurs widely throughout remote Aboriginal communities in the Northern Territory, Western Australia, northern parts of South Australia, and Queensland. The number of people sniffing petrol goes up and down over time as young people experiment or sniff occasionally. "Boss", or chronic, sniffers may move in and out of communities; they are often responsible for encouraging young people to take it up.

A 1983 survey of 4,165 secondary students in New South Wales showed that solvents and aerosols ranked just after analgesics (e.g., codeine pills) and alcohol for drugs that were inappropriately used. This 1983 study did not find any common usage patterns or social class factors. The causes of death for inhalant users in Australia included pneumonia, cardiac failure/arrest, aspiration of vomit, and burns. In 1985, there were 14 communities in Central Australia reporting young people sniffing. In July 1997, it was estimated that there were around 200 young people sniffing petrol across 10 communities in Central Australia. Approximately 40 were classified as chronic sniffers. There have been reports of young Aboriginal people sniffing petrol in the urban areas around Darwin and Alice Springs.

In 2005, the Government of Australia and BP Australia began the usage of opal fuel in remote areas prone to petrol sniffing. Opal is a non-sniffable fuel (which is much less likely to cause a high) and has made a difference in some indigenous communities.

== Administration and effects ==
Inhalant users inhale vapors or aerosol propellant gases using plastic bags held over the mouth or by breathing from an open container of solvents, such as gasoline or paint thinner. Nitrous oxide gases from whipped cream aerosol cans, aerosol hairspray or non-stick frying spray are sprayed into plastic bags. Some nitrous oxide users spray the gas into balloons. When inhaling non-stick cooking spray or other aerosol products, some users may filter the aerosolized particles out with a rag. Some gases, such as propane and butane gases, are inhaled directly from the canister. Once these solvents or gases are inhaled, the extensive capillary surface of the lungs rapidly absorbs the solvent or gas, and blood levels peak rapidly. The intoxication effects occur so quickly that the effects of inhalation can resemble the intensity of effects produced by intravenous injection of other psychoactive drugs.

Ethanol is also inhaled, either by vaporizing it by pouring it over dry ice in a narrow container and inhaling with a straw or by pouring alcohol in a corked bottle with a pipe, and then using a bicycle pump to make a spray. Alcohol can be vaporized using a simple container and open-flame heater. Medical devices such as asthma nebulizers and inhalers were also reported as a means of application. The practice gained popularity in 2004, with the marketing of the device dubbed AWOL (Alcohol without liquid), a play on the military term AWOL (Absent Without Leave). AWOL, created by British businessman Dominic Simler, was first introduced in Asia and Europe, and then in the United States in August 2004. AWOL was used by nightclubs, at gatherings and parties, and it garnered attraction as a novelty, as people 'enjoyed passing it around in a group'. AWOL uses a nebulizer, a machine that agitates the liquid into an aerosol. AWOL's official website states that "AWOL and AWOL 1 are powered by Electrical Air Compressors while AWOL 2 and AWOL 3 are powered by electrical oxygen generators", which refer to a couple of mechanisms used by the nebulizer drug delivery device for inhalation. Although the AWOL machine is marketed as having no downsides, such as the lack of calories or hangovers, Amanda Shaffer of Slate describes these claims as "dubious at best". Although inhaled alcohol does reduce the caloric content, the savings are minimal. After expressed safety and health concerns, sale or use of AWOL machines was banned in a number of American states.

The effects of solvent intoxication can vary widely depending on the dose and what type of solvent or gas is inhaled. A person who has inhaled a small amount of rubber cement or paint thinner vapor may be impaired in a manner resembling alcohol inebriation. A person who has inhaled a larger quantity of solvents or gases, or a stronger chemical, may experience stronger effects such as distortion in perceptions of time and space, hallucinations, and emotional disturbances. The effects of inhalant use are also modified by the combined use of inhalants and alcohol or other drugs.

In the short term, many users experience headaches, nausea and vomiting, slurred speech, loss of motor coordination, and wheezing. A characteristic "glue sniffer's rash" around the nose and mouth is sometimes seen after prolonged use. An odor of paint or solvents on clothes, skin, and breath is sometimes a sign of inhalant abuse, and paint or solvent residues can sometimes emerge in sweat.

According to NIH, even a single session of inhalant use "can disrupt heart rhythms and lower oxygen levels", which can lead to death. "Regular abuse can result in serious harm to the brain, heart, kidneys, and liver."

== General risks ==
Many inhalants are volatile organic chemicals and can catch fire or explode, especially when combined with smoking. As with many other drugs, users may also injure themselves due to loss of coordination or impaired judgment, especially if they attempt to operate machinery.

=== Hypoxia ===
All commonly abused inhalants act as asphyxiant gases, although a common myth is that their primary effects are only due to oxygen deprivation. In reality, the majority of abused inhalants still exhibit psychoactive effects, although oxygen deprivation does add to the notable effects.

Regardless of which inhalant is used, inhaling vapors or gases can lead to injury or death. One major risk is hypoxia (lack of oxygen), which can occur due to inhaling fumes from a plastic bag, or from using proper inhalation mask equipment (e.g., a medical mask for nitrous oxide) but not adding oxygen or room air.

=== Frostbite ===
Another danger is freezing the throat. When a gas that was stored under high pressure is released, it cools abruptly and can cause frostbite if it is inhaled directly from the container. This can occur, for example, with inhaling nitrous oxide. When nitrous oxide is used as an automotive power adder, its cooling effect is used to make the fuel-air charge denser. In a person, this effect is potentially lethal.

The second cause being especially a risk with heavier-than-air vapors such as butane or gasoline vapor. Deaths typically occur from complications related to excessive sedation and vomiting. Actual overdose from the drug does occur, however, and inhaled solvent use is statistically more likely to result in life-threatening respiratory depression than intravenous use of opioids such as heroin. Most deaths from solvent use could be prevented if individuals were resuscitated quickly when they stopped breathing and their airways cleared if they vomited. However, most inhalant use takes place when people inhale solvents by themselves or in groups of people who are intoxicated. Certain solvents are more hazardous than others, such as gasoline.

=== Aerosol burn ===
Use of butane, propane, nitrous oxide and other inhalants can create a risk of freezing burns from contact with the extremely cold liquid. The risk of such contact is greatly increased by the impaired judgement and motor coordination brought on by inhalant intoxication.

=== Risks of specific agents ===
- Methylene chloride, after being metabolized, can cause carbon monoxide poisoning.
- Carbon tetrachloride can cause significant damage to multiple systems, but its association with liver damage is so strong that it is used in animal models to induce liver injury.
- Benzene use can cause bone marrow depression. It is also a known carcinogen.

=== Excess NMDA antagonism ===
Toxicity may also result from the pharmacological properties of the drug; excess NMDA antagonism can completely block calcium influx into neurons and provoke cell death through apoptosis, although this is more likely to be a long-term result of chronic solvent use than a consequence of short-term use.

== Inhalant-related disorders ==
Inhalant-related disorders are a group of mental health conditions associated with the misuse of volatile substances. These disorders are recognised in both the Diagnostic and Statistical Manual of Mental Disorders (DSM-5) and the International Classification of Diseases (ICD-11), though there are notable differences between the two classification systems.

The DSM-5 identifies four primary types of inhalant-related disorders: inhalant intoxication, inhalant use disorder, inhalant-induced disorders, and unspecified inhalant-related disorder.

- Inhalant intoxication refers to acute symptoms resulting from recent inhalant use.
- Inhalant use disorder is characterised by a persistent pattern of volatile hydrocarbon use that leads to clinically significant distress or impairment.
- Inhalant-induced disorders encompass conditions caused by the toxic effects of inhalant substances and include inhalant intoxication delirium, inhalant-induced psychotic disorder, inhalant-induced anxiety disorder, inhalant-induced depressive disorder, and inhalant-induced major or mild neurocognitive disorder.
- Unspecified inhalant-related disorder applies to cases where symptoms linked to inhalant use do not meet the criteria for the other defined categories.

The ICD-11 includes a diagnosis for inhalant withdrawal, which is not covered in the DSM-5.

== In popular culture ==
=== Music and musical culture ===
One of the early musical references to inhalant use occurs in the 1974 Elton John song "The Bitch Is Back", in the line "I get high in the evening sniffing pots of glue." Inhalant use, especially glue-sniffing, is widely associated with the late-1970s punk youth subculture in the UK and North America. Raymond Cochrane and Douglas Carroll claim that when glue sniffing became widespread in the late 1970s, it was "adopted by punks because public [negative] perceptions of sniffing fitted in with their self-image" as rebels against societal values. While punks at first used inhalants "experimentally and as a cheap high, adult disgust and hostility [to the practice] encouraged punks to use glue sniffing as a way of shocking society." As well, using inhalants was a way of expressing their anti-corporatist DIY (do it yourself) credo; by using inexpensive household products as inhalants, punks did not have to purchase industrially manufactured liquor or beer.

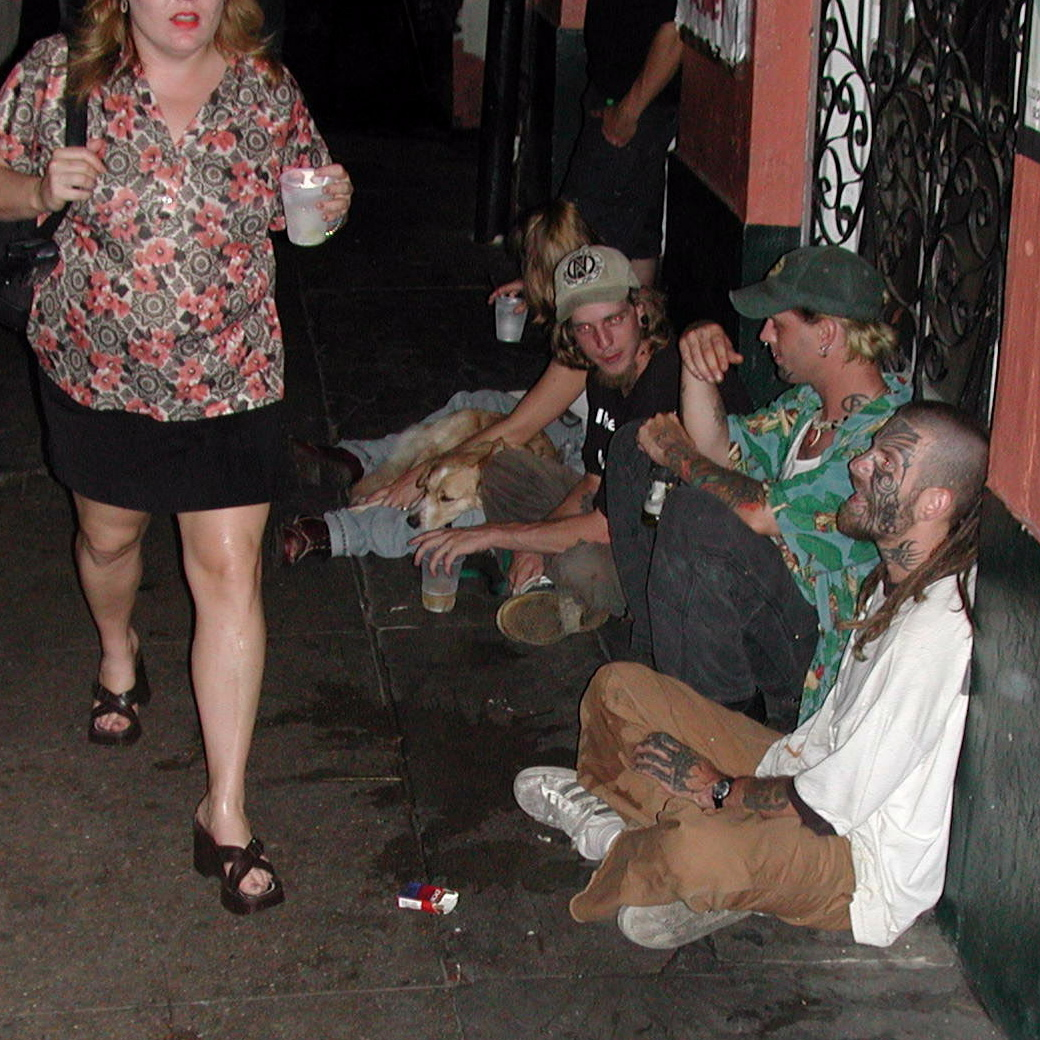
The punk subculture, in which members may live in squats or on the street, has been associated with "glue sniffing" since its inception.

One history of the punk subculture argues that "substance abuse was often referred to in the music and did become synonymous with the genre, glue-sniffing especially" because the youths' "faith in the future had died and that the youth just didn't care anymore" due to the "awareness of the threat of nuclear war and a pervasive sense of doom." In a BBC interview with a person who was a punk in the late 1970s, they said that "there was a real fear of imminent nuclear war—people were sniffing glue knowing that it could kill them, but they didn't care because they believed that very soon everybody would be dead anyway."

A number of 1970s punk rock and 1980s hardcore punk songs refer to inhalant use. The Ramones, an influential early US punk band, referred to inhalant use in several of their songs. The song "Now I Wanna Sniff Some Glue" describes adolescent boredom, and the song "Carbona not Glue" states, "My brain is stuck from shooting glue." An influential punk fanzine about the subculture and music took its name (Sniffin' Glue) from the Ramones song. The 1980s punk band The Dead Milkmen wrote a song, "Life is Shit" from their album Beelzebubba, about two friends hallucinating after sniffing glue. Punk-band-turned-hip-hop group the Beastie Boys penned a song "Hold it Now – Hit It", which includes the line "cause I'm beer drinkin, breath stinkin, sniffing glue." Their song "Shake Your Rump" includes the lines, "Should I have another sip no skip it/In the back of the ride and bust with the whippits". Pop punk band Sum 41 wrote a song, "Fat Lip", which refers to a character who does not "make sense from all the gas you be huffing..." The song "Lança Perfume", written and performed by Brazilian pop star Rita Lee, became a national hit in 1980. The song is about chloroethane and its widespread recreational sale and use during the rise of Brazil's carnivals.

Inhalants are referred to by bands from other genres, including several grunge bands—an early 1990s genre that was influenced by punk rock. The 1990s grunge band Nirvana, which was influenced by punk music, penned a song, "Dumb", in which Kurt Cobain sings "my heart is broke / But I have some glue / help me inhale / And mend it with you". L7, an all-female grunge band, penned a song titled "Scrap" about a skinhead who inhales spray-paint fumes until his mind "starts to gel". Also in the 1990s, the Britpop band Suede had a UK hit with their song "Animal Nitrate" whose title is a thinly veiled reference to amyl nitrite. The Beck song "Fume" from his "Fresh Meat and Old Slabs" release is about inhaling nitrous oxide. Another Beck song, "Cold Ass Fashion", contains the line "O.G. – Original Gluesniffer!" Primus's 1999 song "Lacquer Head" is about adolescents who use inhalants to get high. Hip hop performer Eminem wrote a song, "Bad Meets Evil", which refers to breathing "... ether in three lethal amounts." The Brian Jonestown Massacre, a retro-rock band from the 1990s, has a song, "Hyperventilation", which is about sniffing model-airplane cement. Frank Zappa's song "Teenage Wind" from 1981 has a reference to glue sniffing: "Nothing left to do but get out the 'ol glue; Parents, parents; Sniff it good now..."

=== Films ===
A number of films have depicted or referred to the use of solvent inhalants. In the 1968 film How Sweet It Is!, Grif Henderson (James Garner), refers to him and his young son once making model aeroplanes together, but says, "...now all he wants to do is sniff the glue". In the 1980 comedy film Airplane!, ATC chief McCroskey (Lloyd Bridges) resorts to sniffing glue (along with taking tobacco, alcohol, and amphetamines) as he must bring in a disaster-stricken airliner. In the 1996 film Citizen Ruth, the character Ruth (Laura Dern), a homeless drifter, is depicted inhaling patio sealant from a paper bag in an alleyway. In the tragicomedy Love Liza, the main character, played by Philip Seymour Hoffman, plays a man who takes up building remote-controlled airplanes as a hobby to give him an excuse to sniff the fuel in the wake of his wife's suicide.

Harmony Korine's 1997 Gummo depicts adolescent boys inhaling contact cement for a high. Edet Belzberg's 2001 documentary Children Underground chronicles the lives of Romanian street children addicted to inhaling paint. In The Basketball Diaries, a group of boys is huffing Carbona cleaning liquid at 3 minutes and 27 seconds into the movie; further on, a boy is reading a diary describing the experience of sniffing the cleaning liquid.

In the David Lynch film Blue Velvet, the bizarre and manipulative character played by Dennis Hopper uses a mask to inhale amyl nitrite. In Little Shop of Horrors, Steve Martin's character dies from nitrous oxide inhalation. The 1999 independent film Boys Don't Cry depicts two young low-income women inhaling aerosol computer cleaner (compressed gas) for a buzz. In The Cider House Rules, Michael Caine's character is addicted to inhaling ether vapors.

In Thirteen, the main character, a teen, uses a can of aerosol computer cleaner to get high. In the action movie Shooter, an ex-serviceman on the run from the law (Mark Wahlberg) inhales nitrous oxide gas from a number of Whip-It! whipped cream canisters until he becomes unconscious. The South African film The Wooden Camera also depicts the use of inhalants by one of the main characters, a homeless teen, and their use in terms of socio-economic stratification. The title characters in Samson and Delilah sniff petrol; in Samson's case, possibly causing brain damage.

In the 2004 film Taxi, Queen Latifah and Jimmy Fallon are trapped in a room with a burst tank containing nitrous oxide. Queen Latifah's character curses at Fallon while they both laugh hysterically. Fallon's character asks if it is possible to die from nitrous oxide, to which Queen Latifah's character responds with "It's laughing gas, stupid!" Neither of them had any side effects other than their voices becoming much deeper while in the room.

In the French horror film Them (2006), a French couple living in Romania are pursued by a gang of street children who break into their home at night. Olivia Bonamy's character is later tortured and forced to inhale aurolac from a silver-colored bag. During a flashback scene in the 2001 film Hannibal, Hannibal Lecter gets Mason Verger high on amyl nitrite poppers, then convinces Verger to cut off his own face and feed it to his dogs.

=== Books ===
The science fiction story "Waterspider" by Philip K. Dick (first published in January 1964 in If magazine) contains a scene in which characters from the future are discussing the culture of the early 1950s. One character says: "You mean he sniffed what they called 'airplane dope'? He was a 'glue-sniffer'?", to which another character replies: "Hardly. That was a mania among adolescents and did not become widespread in fact until a decade later. No, I am speaking about imbibing alcohol."

The book Fear and Loathing in Las Vegas describes how the two main characters inhale diethyl ether and amyl nitrite.

=== Television ===
In the comedy series Newman and Baddiel in Pieces, Rob Newman's inhaling gas from a foghorn was a running joke in the series. One episode of the Jeremy Kyle Show featured a woman with a 20-year butane gas addiction. In the series It's Always Sunny in Philadelphia, Charlie Kelly has an addiction to huffing glue. Additionally, season nine episode 8 shows Dennis, Mac, and Dee getting a can of gasoline to use as a solvent, but instead end up taking turns huffing from the canister.

A 2008 episode of the reality show Intervention (season 5, episode 9) featured Allison, who was addicted to huffing computer duster for the short-lived, psychoactive effects. Allison has since achieved a small but significant cult following among bloggers and YouTube users. Several remixes of scenes from Allison's episode can be found online. Since 2009, Allison has worked with drug and alcohol treatment centers in Los Angeles County. In the seventh episode of the fourteenth season of South Park, Towelie, an anthropomorphic towel, develops an addiction to inhaling computer duster. In the show Squidbillies, the main character Early Cuyler is often seen inhaling gas or other substances.

== See also ==
- Inhaler or puffer, a medical device used for delivering medication into the body via the lungs (often used in the treatment of asthma)
- Khaliq v HM Advocate, a Scottish criminal case in which the court ruled that it is an offense to supply materials that were used for sniffing
- Mt Theo Program, a successful petrol-sniffing prevention program run by the indigenous Warlpiri community in Central Australia
- Jenkem, a purported inhalant and hallucinogen supposedly created from fermented human waste
- Substance-induced psychosis
