= Rubbing alcohol =

Alcohol used for germ protection

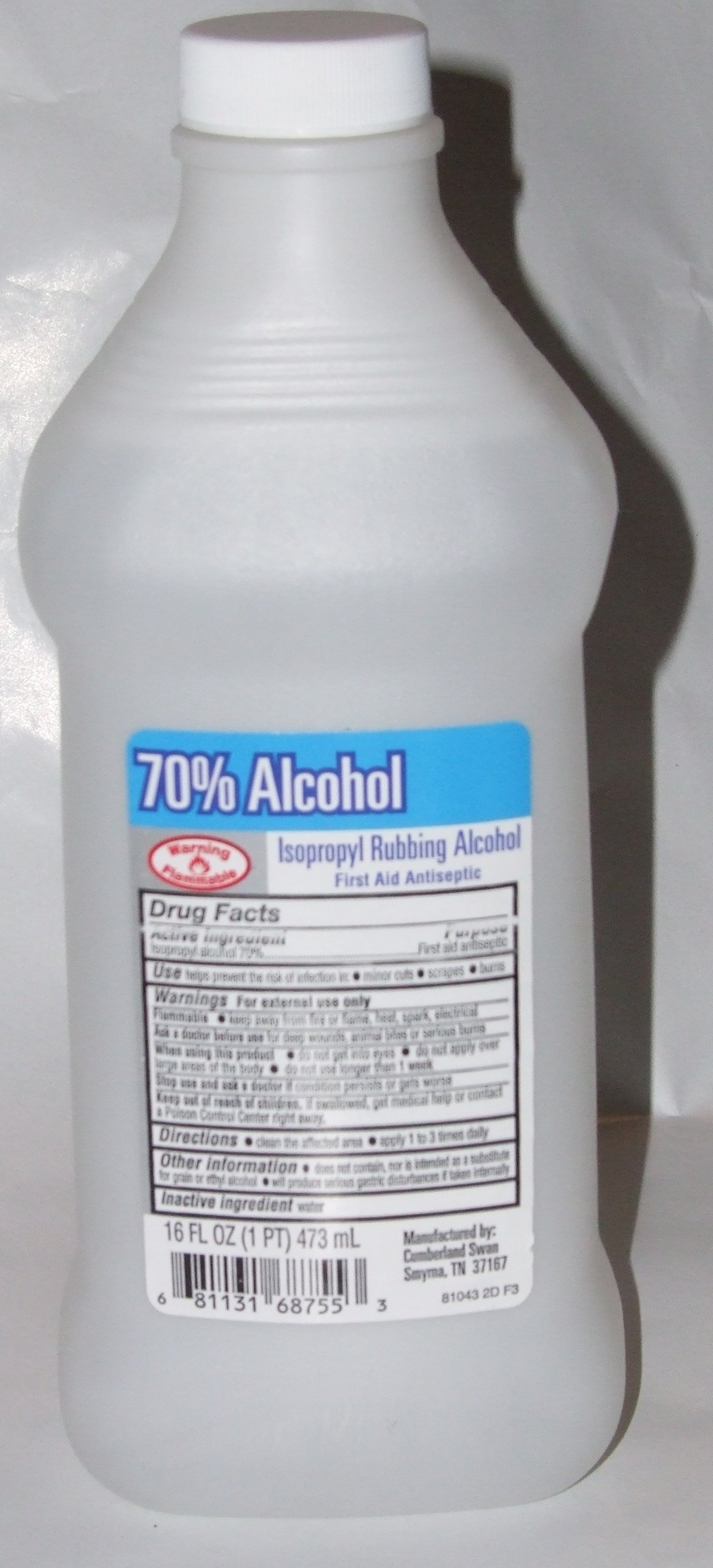
A bottle of isopropyl rubbing alcohol

Rubbing alcohol, known as surgical spirit in the British Pharmacopoeia, refers to a group of denatured alcohol solutions commonly used as topical disinfectant. In addition to its medical applications, rubbing alcohol is employed in various industrial and household contexts. These solutions are primarily composed of either isopropyl alcohol (isopropanol) or ethanol, with isopropyl alcohol being the more widely available formulation.

The United States Pharmacopeia (USP) defines "isopropyl rubbing alcohol USP" as a solution containing approximately 70% alcohol by volume of pure isopropanol, while "rubbing alcohol USP" refers to a solution containing approximately 70% by volume of denatured ethanol. In Ireland and the United Kingdom, the comparable product is "surgical spirit B.P.", defined by the British Pharmacopoeia as containing 95% methylated spirit, 2.5% castor oil, 2% diethyl phthalate, and 0.5% methyl salicylate. Known alternatively as "wintergreen oil", methyl salicylate is also a common additive in North American rubbing alcohol products.

Manufacturers are permitted to use their own formulations, and retail rubbing alcohol typically contains between 70% and 99% alcohol by volume, depending on the specific product and intended use.

Rubbing alcohol is unsafe for human consumption. Isopropyl rubbing alcohol does not contain the ethyl alcohol found in alcoholic beverages, and even ethanol-based rubbing alcohol often contains substances that are toxic when ingested. For this reason, most rubbing alcohol contains a bitterant which serve to make it undrinkable and prevent misuse.

== History ==
The term rubbing alcohol came into prominence in North America during the Prohibition era of 1920 to 1933, when alcoholic beverages were prohibited throughout the United States. The term rubbing emphasized that this alcohol was not intended for consumption. Nevertheless it was well documented as a surrogate alcohol as early as 1925.

Alcohol was already widely used as a liniment for massage. There was no standard formula for rubbing alcohol, which was sometimes perfumed with additives such as wintergreen oil (methyl salicylate).

== Properties ==
All rubbing alcohols are volatile and flammable. Ethyl rubbing alcohol has an extremely bitter taste from additives. The specific gravity of Formula 23-H is between 0.8691 and 0.8771 at 15.56 °C (60.01 °F).

Isopropyl rubbing alcohols contain from 50% to 99% by volume of isopropyl alcohol, the remainder consisting of water. Boiling points vary with the proportion of isopropyl alcohol from 80 to 83 °C (176 to 181 °F); likewise, freezing points vary from −32 to −50 °C (−26 to −58 °F). Surgical spirit BP boils at 80 °C (176 °F).

Naturally colorless, products may contain color additives. They may also contain medically-inactive additives for fragrance, such as wintergreen oil (methyl salicylate), or for other purposes.

== US legislation ==
To protect alcohol tax revenue in the United States, all preparations classified as Rubbing Alcohols (defined as those containing ethanol) must have poisonous additives to limit human consumption in accordance with the requirements of the US Treasury Department, Bureau of Alcohol, Tobacco, and Firearms, using Formula 23-H (8 parts by volume of acetone, 1.5 parts by volume of methyl isobutyl ketone, and 100 parts by volume of ethyl alcohol). It contains 87.5–91% by volume of absolute ethyl alcohol. The rest consists of water and the denaturants, with or without color additives, and perfume oils. Rubbing alcohol contains in each 100 ml more than 355 mg of sucrose octaacetate or more than 1.40 mg of denatonium benzoate. The preparation may be colored with one or more color additives. A suitable stabilizer may also be added.

== Warnings ==
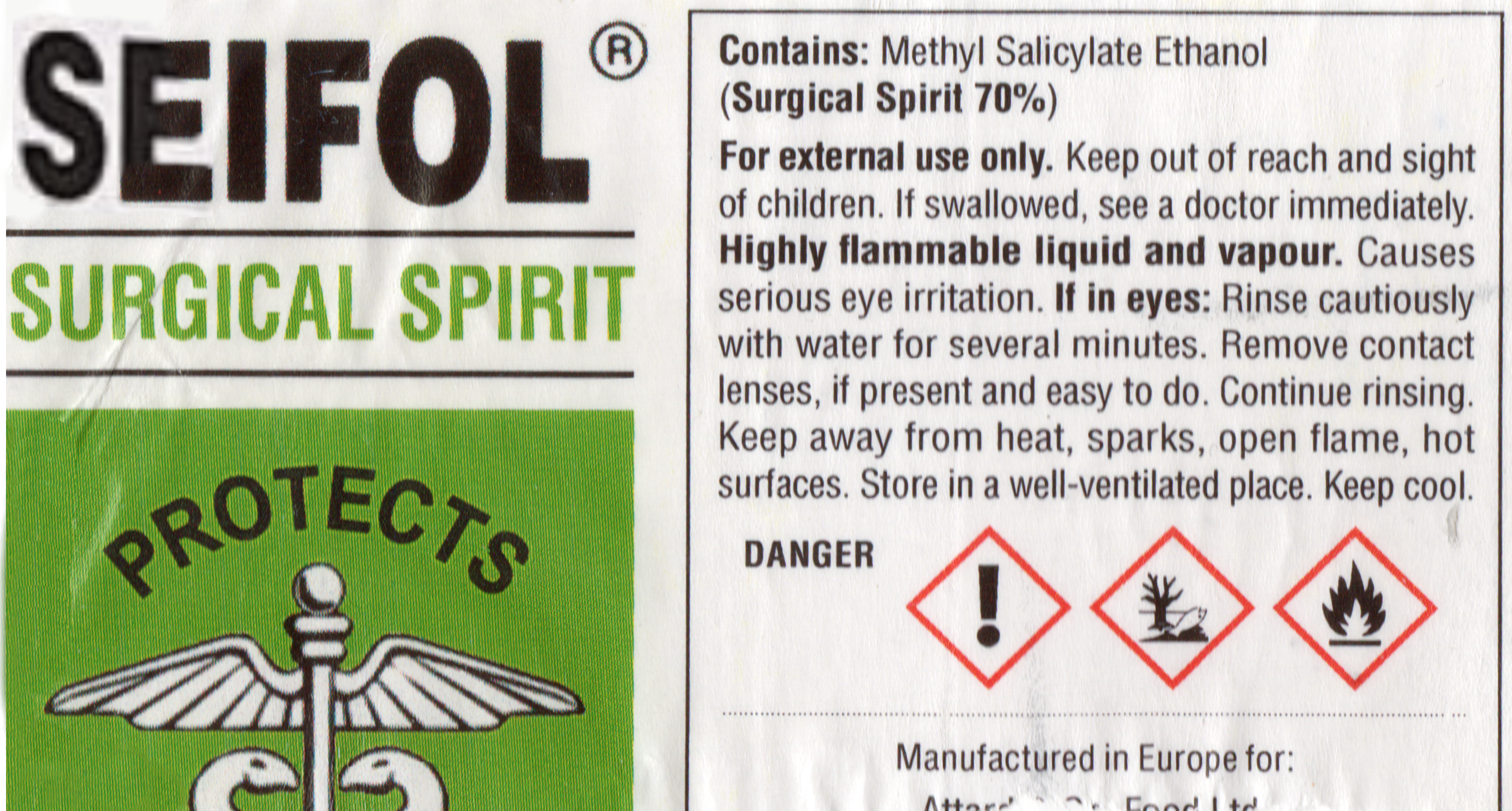
Warnings and label of a bottle of surgical spirit

Product labels for rubbing alcohol include a number of hazard symbols about the chemical, including the flammability hazards and its intended use only as a topical antiseptic and not for internal wounds or consumption. It should be used in a well-ventilated area due to inhalation hazards. Poisoning can occur from ingestion, inhalation, absorption, or consumption of rubbing alcohol.

== See also ==
- Methanol
- Aminomethanol
- Methanol (data page)
- Methanol economy
- Trimethyl carbinol
