= Denatured alcohol =

Ethanol with additives to discourage recreational consumption

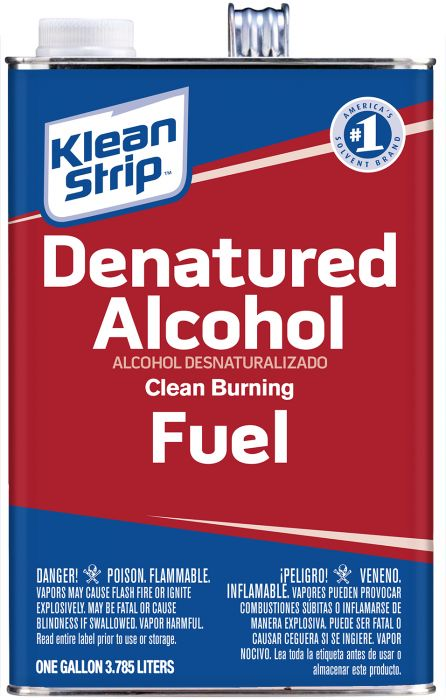
1 US gallon or 3.785 litres of denatured alcohol in a metal container

Denatured alcohol, also known as methylated spirits, metho, or meths in Australia, Ireland, New Zealand, South Africa, and the United Kingdom, and as denatured rectified spirit, is ethanol that has additives to make it poisonous, bad-tasting, foul-smelling, or nauseating to discourage its recreational consumption. It is sometimes dyed so that it can be identified visually. Pyridine and methanol, each and together, make denatured alcohol poisonous; denatonium makes it bitter.

Denatured alcohol is used as a solvent and as fuel for alcohol burners and camping stoves. Because of the diversity of industrial uses for denatured alcohol, hundreds of additives and denaturing methods have been used. The main additive usually is 10% methanol (methyl alcohol), hence the name methylated spirits. Other common additives include isopropyl alcohol, acetone, methyl ethyl ketone, and methyl isobutyl ketone.

Denaturing alcohol does not alter the ethanol molecule (chemically or structurally), unlike denaturation in biochemistry. Rather, the ethanol is mixed with other chemicals to form a foul-tasting, often toxic, solution. For many of these solutions, it is intentionally difficult to separate the components.

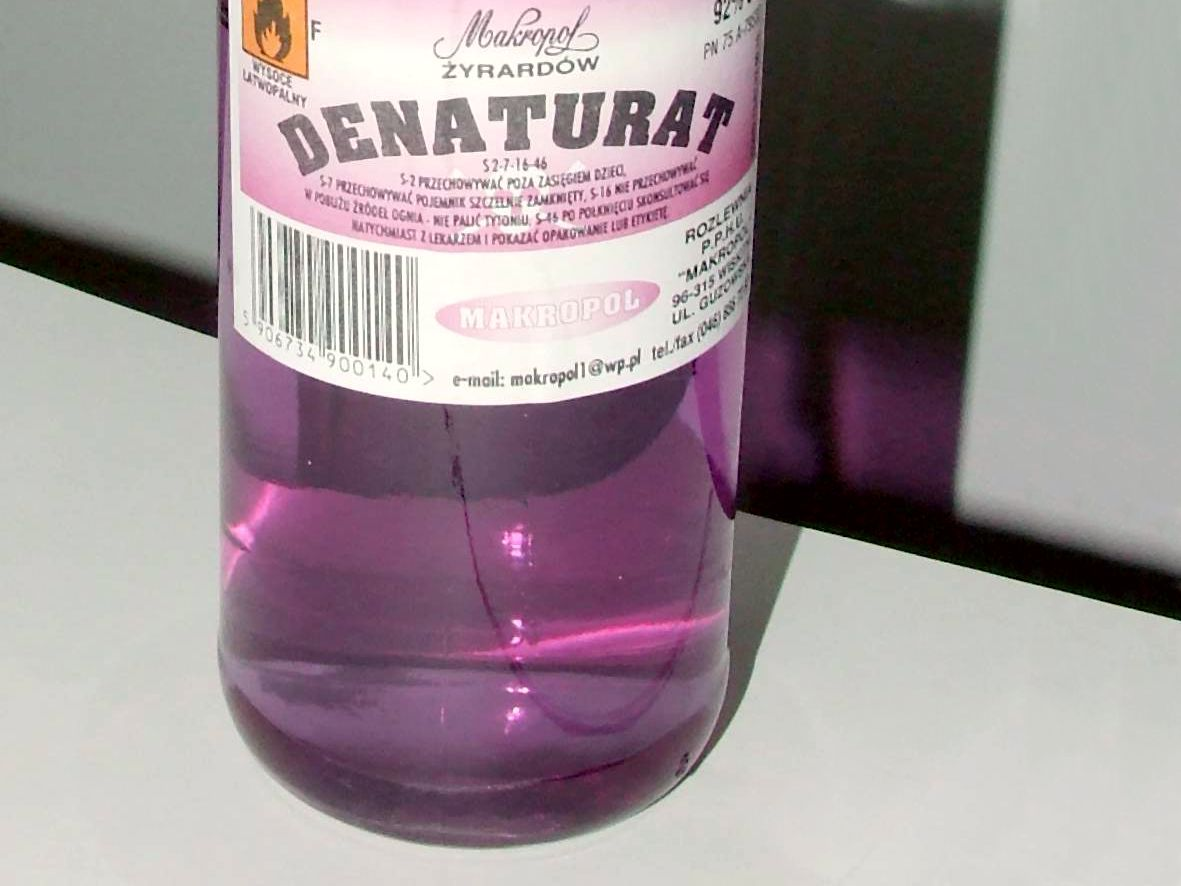
Bottle of purple-dyed denatured alcohol sold in Poland

In many countries denaturated alcohol is traditionally dyed with methyl violet or similar hue (crystal violet, methylene blue) dye for safety reasons. In Central and Eastern Europe (what are now) Czech Republic, Slovakia, Poland and others, this was mandatory during the communist era.

== Uses ==
In many countries, sales of alcoholic beverages are heavily taxed for revenue and public health policy purposes (see Pigovian tax). In order to avoid requiring beverage taxes on alcohol that is not meant to be consumed, the alcohol is usually "denatured", or treated with added chemicals to make it unpalatable. Its composition is tightly defined by government regulations in countries that tax alcoholic beverages. Denatured alcohol is used identically to ethanol itself but only for applications that involve fuel, surgical and laboratory stock. Pure ethanol is required for food and beverage applications and certain chemical reactions where the denaturant would interfere. In molecular biology, denatured ethanol should not be used for the precipitation of nucleic acids, since the additives may interfere with downstream applications.

Denatured alcohol has no advantages for any purpose over normal ethanol; it is a public policy compromise. As denatured alcohol is sold without the often heavy taxes on alcohol suitable for consumption, it is a cheaper solution for most uses that do not involve drinking. If pure ethanol were made cheaply available for fuel, solvents, or medicinal purposes, it could be used as a beverage without payment of alcohol tax.

== Toxicity ==
Despite its poisonous content, denatured alcohol is sometimes consumed as a surrogate alcohol. This can result in blindness or death if it contains methanol. For instance, during the thirteen-year prohibition of alcohol in the US, federal law required methanol be added to domestically manufactured industrial alcohols. From 25 to 27 December 1926, which was roughly at the midpoint of nationwide alcohol prohibition, 31 people in New York City alone died of methanol poisoning. To help prevent this, denatonium is often added to give the substance an extremely bitter flavour. Substances such as pyridine are added to give the mixture an unpleasant odour, and agents such as syrup of ipecac may also be included to induce vomiting.

New Zealand has removed methanol from its government-approved "methylated spirits" formulation.

In the USSR, denatured alcohol was used as drinking alcohol surrogate, along with many other technical ethanol-containing products. This was especially common during various anti-alcohol campaigns initiated by the Soviet government. There is much evidence to that in both popular folklore and in literature and music. The word "denaturat" (Russian: денатурат) even gained a special symbolic meaning. Its consumption is mentioned in songs of Vladimir Vysotsky, as well as written works of Venedikt Yerofeev, Yuz Aleshkovsky, and Vyacheslav Shishkov.

== Formulations ==
Diverse additives are used to make it difficult to use distillation or other simple processes to reverse the denaturation. Methanol is commonly used both because its boiling point is close to that of ethanol and because it is toxic. Another typical denaturant is pyridine. Often the denatured alcohol is dyed with methyl violet.

There are several grades of denatured alcohol, but in general the denaturants used are similar. As an example, the formulation for completely denatured alcohol, according to 2005 British regulations was as follows:

Completely denatured alcohol must be made in accordance with the following formulation: with every 90 parts by volume of alcohol mix 9.5 parts by volume of wood naphtha [i.e., methanol] or a substitute and 0.5 parts by volume of crude pyridine, and to the resulting mixture add mineral naphtha (petroleum oil) in the proportion of 3.75 litres to every 1000 litres of the mixture and synthetic organic dyestuff (methyl violet) in the proportion of 1.5 grams to every 1000 litres of the mixture.

The European Union agreed in February 2013 to the following mutual procedures for the complete denaturing of alcohol:

Per hectolitre (100 L) of absolute ethanol: 3 litres of isopropyl alcohol, 3 litres of methyl ethyl ketone (Butanone) and 1 gram denatonium benzoate.

=== Specially denatured alcohol ===
A specially denatured alcohol (SDA) is one of many types of denatured alcohol specified under the United States Title 27 of the Code of Federal Regulations Section 21.151. A specially denatured alcohol is a combination of ethanol and another chemical substance, e.g., ethyl acetate in SDA 29, 35, and 35A, added to render the mixture unsuitable for drinking. SDAs are often used in cosmetic products, and can also be used in chemical manufacturing, pharmaceuticals, and solvents. Another example is SDA 40-B, which contains tert-butyl alcohol and denatonium benzoate, N.F. In the United States and other countries, the use of denatured alcohol unsuitable for beverages avoids excise taxes on alcohol.

== See also ==
- Aversive agent
- Bitterant
- E85
- Isopropyl alcohol
- Rubbing alcohol
