= Chroming =

Chroming may refer to:

- Chrome plating
- the use of inhalants
