= Volatile inhalant withdrawal =

- Specialty: Psychiatry
- Symptoms: Dysphoria, insomnia, transient illusions, anxiety, irritability, nausea, shakiness, perspiration
- Complications: Encephalopathy; Damage to the brain, kidney, and liver; cardiac arrest; suffocation
- Usual onset: 1-2 days after last inhalant use
- Duration: 3-7 days
- Causes: Stopping inhalant use
- Risk factors: Inhalant use disorder
- Treatment: Medication, psychiatric support
- Frequency: 0.4% of 12-17 age group

Volatile inhalant withdrawal is a group of symptoms, behaviours, and physiological changes that can occur when individuals who are dependent on inhalants abruptly reduce or stop their use. This condition is most often seen in those who have engaged in prolonged or heavy inhalant use.

== Epidemiology ==
Inhalant use disorder is a type of substance use disorder which is characterized by the use of inhalants such as the use of volatile hydrocarbons from gases or glues, fuels, paints among other volatile substances which leads to clinically significant impairment or distress. In the United States, adolescents aged 12 - 17 are at higher risk, with an estimated 0.4% of this age group meeting the criteria for inhalant use disorder.

Individuals can use inhalants without meeting the criteria for a substance use disorder. It is reported that around 10% of teenagers ages 13 - 17 have used inhalants once in their lifetime. Around 20% will develop an inhalant use disorder. It is also reported that 4% of 8th graders had used inhalants within the past year in 2024.

Adolescents are at increased risk for inhalant use which if left untreated can progress to inhalant use disorder. Early identification, screening, and treatment of inhalant use may help prevent progression to inhalant use disorder.

== Symptoms ==
The severity and duration of volatile inhalant withdrawal symptoms can vary. Common symptoms may include dysphoria, insomnia, transient illusions, anxiety, irritability, nausea, shakiness, perspiration.

Difluoroethane (DFE) is an inexpensive volatile substance that is commonly found in household items. DFE can be found in compressed air dusters, refrigerants, and propellants and can be utilized to induce a brief sense of euphoria when inhaled. DFE works by being a central nervous system (CNS) depressant.

Symptoms of withdrawal from volatile inhalant use are reported to vary, but approximately 50% patients reported experiencing withdrawal symptoms. Symptoms usually start 1 - 2 days after the last time the volatile inhalant was used and last anywhere from 3 - 7 days. Psychotic symptoms, such as hallucinations, usually resolve quickly but other symptoms such as anxiety or insomnia can last for weeks after stopping inhalant use.

== Method of use ==
Inhalants act quickly because they are volatile substances and are fat soluble. This property allows them to quickly cross the blood brain barrier and cause a rapid feeling of euphoria and changes to thinking and behavior. There are a variety of different methods to use inhalants. Some of these methods include "sniffing," "bagging," and "huffing." "Sniffing" refers to inhaling fumes directly from a product or its open container. "Bagging" refers to the method of use that involves spraying or releasing the inhalable substance into a bag and inhaling the contents immediately afterwards. Lastly, "huffing" refers to the method of use where the inhalable substance is sprayed or poured onto a rag or cloth and the fumes from the cloth are inhaled. There are other ways to use these substances, but all methods contain inhalation to provide a rapid sense of euphoria.

== Signs of intoxication ==
People who use inhalants may have chemical odors on their breath or clothing. They may display paint stains or chemical stains on their hands, face and or clothing. In addition, they may attempt to conceal empty paint or solvent cans or hide rags or clothing soaked with chemicals.

Signs of inhalant intoxication may include a dazed or disoriented appearance, slurred speech, and nausea or vomiting. Anxiety, irritability, depression, lack of coordination, or inattentiveness may also occur, depending on the amount of inhalant used. Using inhalants can lead to many health issues. For example, using inhalants regularly can cause damage to the brain, kidney and liver. Additionally, using these substances can have deadly outcomes, including cardiac arrest or suffocation.

== Diagnostic manuals ==
The International Classification of Diseases (ICD-11) recognises volatile inhalant withdrawal as a distinct condition. The Diagnostic and Statistical Manual of Mental Disorders (DSM-5) does not currently list inhalant withdrawal as a diagnostic category. This omission is attributed to a lack of substantial evidence demonstrating a consistent and severe withdrawal pattern comparable to that seen with psychoactive substances like phencyclidine (PCP) or hallucinogens.

A national study involving individuals diagnosed with inhalant dependence (under DSM-IV-TR criteria) found that nearly 48% experienced three or more significant withdrawal symptoms. This evidence has led some experts to advocate for the inclusion of inhalant withdrawal criteria in future editions of the DSM.

== Treatment ==
There is limited research on effective treatment options for inhalant use. Currently there is no FDA approved pharmacotherapy or standardized protocol for treating inhalant use in the medical community. Additionally, treatments that do exist have only been tested on small sample sizes or studied in only one patient so they are not applicable to larger populations.

However there is evidence that shows that an effective way to manage inhalant and volatile substance use requires a combination approach that incorporates pharmacological, psychosocial and holistic support programs. Further research is necessary to develop standardized treatment protocols that can be broadly applied across many populations.
