= Sucrose octaacetate =

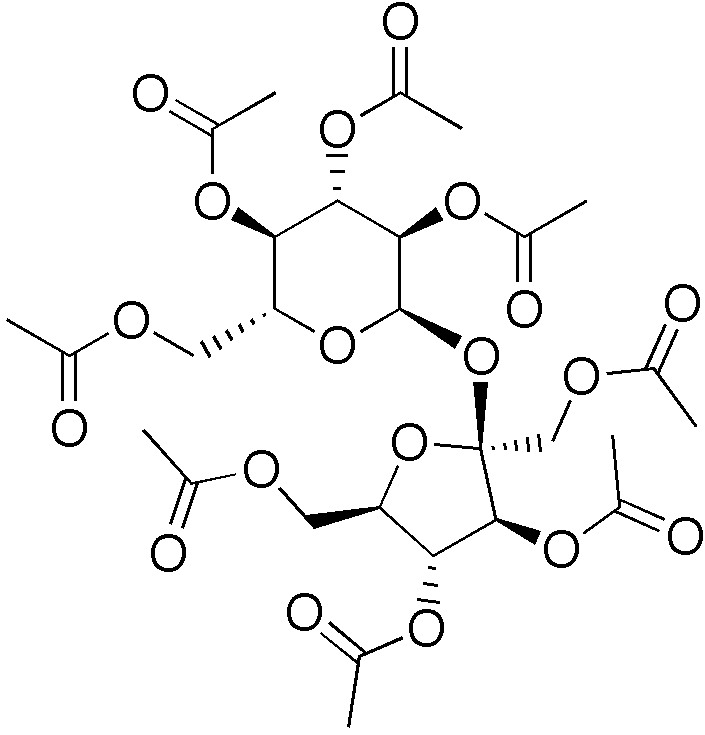

Names
- IUPAC name 1,3,4,5-Tetra-O-acetyl-β-D-fructofuranosyl α-D-glucopyranoside 2,3,4,6-tetraacetate
- Systematic IUPAC name (2R,3R,4S,5R,6R)-6-{[(2S,3S,4R,5R)-2,3,4,5-Tetrakis(acetyloxy)oxolan-2-yl]oxy}oxane-2,3,4,5-tetrayl tetraacetate
- Other names Acetic acid [(2S,3S,4R,5R)-4-acetoxy-2,5-bis(acetoxymethyl)-2-{[(2R,3R,4S,5R,6R)-3,4,5-triacetoxy-6- (acetoxymethyl)-2-tetrahydropyranyl]oxy}-3-tetrahydrofuranyl] ester

Identifiers
CAS Number	126-14-7
3D model (JSmol)	Interactive image
ChEBI	CHEBI:180783
ChEMBL	ChEMBL2105790
ChemSpider	29073
ECHA InfoCard	100.004.339
EC Number	204-772-1
KEGG	D05935
PubChem CID	31340
UNII	07V591057T
CompTox Dashboard (EPA)	DTXSID3042423
- InChI: InChI=1S/C28H38O19/c1-12(29)37-9-20-22(40-15(4)32)24(42-17(6)34)25(43-18(7)35)27(45-20)47-28(11-39-14(3)31)26(44-19(8)36)23(41-16(5)33)21(46-28)10-38-13(2)30/h20-27H,9-11H2,1-8H3/t20-,21-,22-,23-,24+,25-,26+,27-,28+/m1/s1 Key: ZIJKGAXBCRWEOL-SAXBRCJISA-N
- SMILES: CC(=O)OC[C@@H]1[C@H]([C@@H]([C@H]([C@H](O1)O[C@]2([C@H]([C@@H]([C@H](O2)COC(=O)C)OC(=O)C)OC(=O)C)COC(=O)C)OC(=O)C)OC(=O)C)OC(=O)C

Properties
Chemical formula	C_{28}H_{38}O_{19}
Molar mass	678.59 g/mol
Appearance	colorless needles
Odor	odourless
Density	1.27 g/cm^{3} at 16 °C
Melting point	86.5 °C (187.7 °F; 359.6 K)
Boiling point	250 °C (482 °F; 523 K) at 1 mmHg
Solubility in water	slightly soluble in water
Solubility	soluble in ethanol, diethyl ether, acetone, benzene, chloroform, toluene
- Except where otherwise noted, data are given for materials in their standard state (at 25 °C [77 °F], 100 kPa). verify (what is ?) Infobox references

Sucrose octaacetate is a chemical compound with formula C_{28}H_{38}O_{19}or (C_{2}H_{3}O_{2})_{8}(C_{12}H_{14}O_{3}), an eight-fold ester of sucrose and acetic acid. Its molecule can be described as that of sucrose C_{12}H_{22}O_{11} with its eight hydroxyl groups HO– replaced by acetate groups H_{3}C–CO_{2}–. It is a crystalline solid, colorless and odorless but intensely bitter.

Sucrose octaacetate is used as an inert ingredient in pesticides and herbicides, as a bitter additive.

== History ==
The preparation of sucrose octaacetate was first described in 1865 by P. Schutzenberger, but its purification and characterization were first published by A. Herzfeld in 1887.

== Preparation ==
The compound can be prepared by the exothermic reaction of sucrose with acetic anhydride at about 145 °C, with sodium acetate as catalyst. The product can be purified by dissolution in ethanol and recrystallization.

== Properties ==
=== Structure ===
The structure of the crystallized form was determined by J. D. Oliver and L. C. Strickland in 1984, using X-ray diffraction. The crystal system is orthorhombic, symmetry group P2_{1}2_{1}2_{1}, with parameters a = 1.835 nm, b= 2.144 nm, c= 0.835 nm, Z=4, V=3.285 nm^{3}, D_{x} = 1.372 g/mL. The pyranose and furanose rings are in "chair" (^{4}C_{1}) and "twist" (^{4}T_{1}) conformations, respectively, unlike their conformations in saccharose.

=== Physico-chemical ===
Sucrose octaacetate is only slightly soluble in water (sources give 0.25 to 1.4 g/L at room temperature) but is soluble in many common organic solvents such as toluene and ethanol, from which it can be crystallized by evaporation. It is also soluble in supercritical carbon dioxide. It is a neutral molecule with no ionizable hydrogen atoms.

The compound melts into a viscous liquid (29.54 poises at 100.2 °C), that becomes a clear glassy solid on cooling.

The density of the glassy form is 1.28 kg;L (at 20 °C), its index of refraction n_{D}^{20} is 1.4660, its dielectric constant is 4.5 (at 1 kHz), and its resistivity is 1.5 × 10^{14} Ω cm. It is optically active with [α]_{D}^{24} = +59.79°.

The compound slowly hydrolyzes in water: 0.25% of the acetate ester bonds were broken by boiling in water for 1 hour, and 0.20% after standing in water at 40 °C for 5 days.

Sucrose octaacetate decomposes at about 285 °C, but can be distilled at reduced pressure at 260 °C.

=== Organoleptic ===
The compound is odorless but intensely bitter, being detectable at a concentration of 1–2 ppm. Adding 0.6 g of the compound to 1 kg of sugar renders it too bitter to eat.

=== Melting point and possible polymorphism ===
There has been significant discrepancy in the reported melting point of the crystalline compound. Five reports spanning 1880 to 1928 gave it as 69–70 °C. In 1930, a crystal form was reported to melt at 75 °C. In 1936, another report described a different crystal form and a melting point of 83 °C. In 1940, the same authors found 89 °C. All reports since then have given melting points in 83–89 °C range.

It was conjectured that the differences could be due to polymorphism; namely, that the compound could crystallize in two or more different crystal structures, with different melting points. However, modern studies, including X-ray diffraction, failed to find any evidence of polymorphism.

== Reactions ==
Sucrose octaacetate can be converted to other eightfold fatty acid esters of sucrose by reacting it with the appropriate triglyceride with sodium methoxide as catalyst. This way one can obtain sucrose octacaprylate (C_{8} chain), octacaprate (C_{10}, m.p −24 °C) octalaurate (C_{12}, 10 °C), octamyristate (C_{14}, 34 °C), octapalmitate, (C_{16}, 50.5 °C), octastearate (C_{18}, 61 °C), octaoleate (C_{18} cis-9), octaelaidate (C_{18} trans-9, 7.4 °C), and octalinoleate (C_{18} cis-9,12).

== Applications ==
=== Bitterant ===
Sucrose octaacetate has been used to determine tasters from non-tasters in mice, in clinical drug studies and sweetener evaluations, and in taste physiology research.

The product has also been used as a bitterant and aversive agent. Until 1993, the compound was the active ingredient of over-the-counter preparations to discourage thumb sucking and nail biting. It has also been used in sprays and lotions to prevent dog licking, and as an additive to deter ingestion of pesticides and other toxic products.

=== Flavoring agent ===
Sucrose octaacetate is used as a flavoring agent in foods and beverages, such as in bitters and ginger ale.

=== Plasticizer ===
Sucrose octaacetate has been used as an adhesive and as a plasticizer in lacquers and plastics. While the crystalline character of the pure compound is an obstacle for this latter application, mixed esters where some acetate groups are replaced by propionate or isobutyrate can be used.

== Safety ==
Due to its low toxicity, sucrose octaacetate was authorized by the US Environment Protection Agency for use as an inert ingredient in pesticides, as food additive, and as a nail-biting and thumb-sucking deterrent in over-the-counter drug products.

== See also ==
- Glucose pentaacetate
- Sucrose octapropionate
- Sucrose octabutyrate
