= Millard Bass =

American forensic pathologist (died 2018)

Millard Bass (died 2018), was an American forensic pathologist and former deputy medical examiner for the State of New York. In 1970 he coined the term "sudden sniffing death syndrome".

== Selected publications ==
- Bass, Millard (22 June 1970). "Sudden Sniffing Death". JAMA. 212 (12): 2075–2079. doi:10.1001/jama.1970.03170250031004. ISSN 0098-7484.
