= Rugby boy =

Gangs of street children in the Philippines

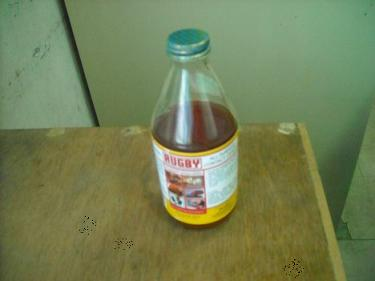
Contact cement.

Rugby boys (Filipino: batang rugby) are a collective term for gangs of street children found in the Philippines. They are one of the most well-known poverty-afflicted people found in the slums of the Philippines. They are known for using and being addicted to a contact cement known as "Rugby," a popular brand name, that eventually became a generic term for contact cement adhesive, to alleviate their hunger, and resulting in crime to fund their addiction.

Data from the Philippine Department of Social Welfare and Development show that the number of street children increased by 6,365 yearly, and half of the country’s street children, from 8 to 20 years old, have at one time sniffed Rugby and other inhalants. The relative ease of procuring these substances due to their low cost contributes to widespread abuse. There is no comprehensive epidemiologic data on the magnitude of inhalant abuse among children and adolescents in the Philippines.

In response to widespread abuse of toluene-based substances, stricter rules have been imposed on the manufacture and sale of Rugby and similar glues by the Philippine Drug Enforcement Agency, such as the mandatory addition of 5% mustard oil as a sniffing deterrent. In addition, purchasers will now be required to present valid identification for them to have access to contact cement that doesn't contain any bitterants or other such deterrents.

== History ==
In terms of addiction, inhalants are ordinary household products such as cleaners, cooking sprays, fabric protectors, paint thinner, and adhesives and solvents. Because of the low cost of contact cement and other inhalants, poor people (especially inexperienced and destitute youths) use them to relieve common poverty health problems. “Solvent Boys," which despite the name refers to children irrespective of gender, openly engage in the consumption of such inhalants. The chemical is placed in a plastic bag and inhaled from the bag to achieve euphoria.

The impoverished population is the most common victim of addiction to dangerous and illegal substances. Once they are "high" they forget their hunger. Others become addicted because of family problems, poor self-esteem, and peer pressure. Solvents are the inhalant of choice in the Philippines for most teenagers since it is easily obtained. Some store owners sell the adhesives in small portions to children and teenagers.

== Health problems ==
Inhalants cause nausea, blurred vision, memory lapse, and loss of motor coordination. These effects may be a minor discomfort to the user after inhalation, but permanent damage from inhalants is irreversible. Damage to organs such as the liver, kidneys, brain, and heart could be fatal.

A documentary by Karen Davila showed the effects of inhalant abuse on a person's body.

The chemical toluene provides the aromatic smell of contact cement and other glue and is the cause of the addiction. Toluene abusers are exposed to levels above 1000 ppm (parts per million). Levels of exposure greater than 600 ppm cause confusion and delirium. Inhalant abuse causes permanent damage to the brain and may result in sudden death. It can also cause loss of memory, confusion or disorientation, distorted perception of time and distance, hallucinations, nausea, emesis and psychoorganic syndrome. Inhalant abuse leads to muscle cramps and weakness, numbness of limbs, abdominal pains, damage to the central nervous system, kidneys and liver. It also produces psychological dependence. Once the habit is formed, the dose must be increased gradually to produce the same effect.

== Crimes attributed ==
Many Solvent boys have resorted to crime to fund their addiction. These crimes include robbery, aggressive threats and hold-ups, drug trafficking, and racketeering, and small organized crimes.

Many of their crimes occur in crowded public places when the police are distracted.

== See also ==
- Street children in the Philippines
