= Denaturation (food) =

Adding a substance to make food unpalatable

Denaturation is the process by which foods or liquids are made unpleasant or dangerous to consume; it is done by adding a substance known as a denaturant. Aversive agents—primarily bitterants and pungent agents—are often used to produce an unpleasant flavor. For example, the bitterant denatonium might be added to food used in a laboratory, where such food is not intended for human consumption.

A poisonous substance may be added as an even more powerful deterrent. For example, methanol is blended with ethanol to produce denatured alcohol. The addition of methanol, which is poisonous, renders denatured alcohol unfit for consumption, as ingesting denatured alcohol may result in serious injury or death. Thus denatured alcohol is not subject to the taxes usually levied on the production and sale of alcoholic beverages. Aniline was used to denature colza oil in the 1980s.

== See also ==
- Denaturation (biochemistry)
