= Aurolac =

Type of industrial adhesive

Aurolac is an industrial adhesive sold in Romania, designed for use in repairing terracotta stoves, which is commonly abused as an inhalant. The law HG 767/2001 applies restrictions on where and how aurolac, which it uses as a generic term for a variety of substances containing ethers, ketones, acetates, as well as methanol and toluene, can be sold.

In 2000, a child who had abused Aurolac was photographed while naked and crying in a tram station in Bucharest's Rahova district. The image was widely published and used to define social problems in Romania. The 2001 documentary Children Underground also details the effects of Aurolac abuse amongst Bucharest's homeless children.
