= Sucrose octapropionate =

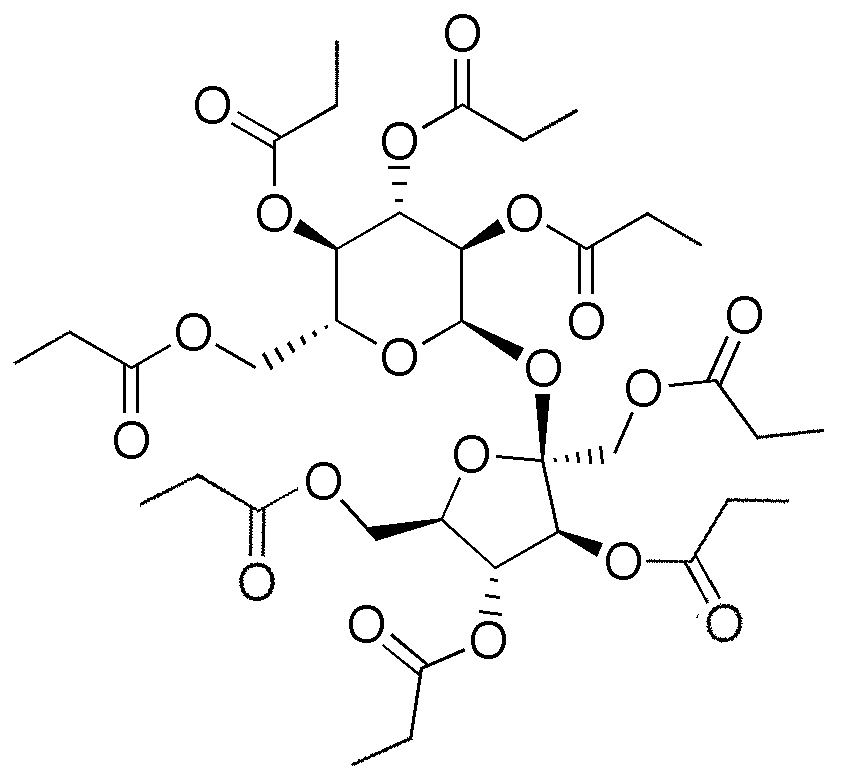

Names
- IUPAC name 1,3,4,6-Tetra-O-propionyl-β-D-fructofuranosyl 2,3,4,6-tetra-O-propionyl-α-D-glucopyranoside
- Other names sucrose octapropanoate, octapropionyl sucrose

Identifiers
| 3D model (JSmol) | Interactive image |
| ChemSpider | 9731625 |
| PubChem CID | 11556847 |
- InChI: Key: PGIIRNKNDYWWSN-ZRCJJVNESA-N; InChI=1S/C36H54O19/c1-9-22(37)45-17-20-30(49-25(40)12-4)32(51-27(42)14-6)33(52-28(43)15-7)35(48-20)55-36(19-47-24(39)11-3)34(53-29(44)16-8)31(50-26(41)13-5)21(54-36)18-46-23(38)10-2/h20-21,30-35H,9-19H2,1-8H3/t20-,21-,30-,31-,32+,33-,34+,35-,36+/m1/s1
- SMILES: O=C(O[C@H]1[C@H](O[C@H](COC(=O)CC)[C@@H](OC(=O)CC)[C@@H]1OC(=O)CC)O[C@@]2(O[C@@H]([C@@H](OC(=O)CC)[C@@H]2OC(=O)CC)COC(=O)CC)COC(=O)CC)CC

Properties
| Chemical formula | C_{36}H_{54}O_{19} |
| Appearance | colorless crystalline solid |
| Density | 1.185 g/L |
| Melting point | 45.4 °C (113.7 °F; 318.5 K) |
| Boiling point | 280–290 °C (536–554 °F; 553–563 K) at 0.05 torr |
| Solubility in water | less than 0.1 g/L |
| Solubility | ethanol, isopropanol, toluene, acetone |
- Except where otherwise noted, data are given for materials in their standard state (at 25 °C [77 °F], 100 kPa). Infobox references

Sucrose octapropionate is a chemical compound with formula C_{36}H_{54}O_{19} or (C_{3}H_{5}O_{2})_{8}(C_{12}H_{14}O_{3}), an eight-fold ester of sucrose and propionic acid. Its molecule can be described as that of sucrose C_{12}H_{22}O_{11} with its eight hydroxyl groups HO– replaced by propionate groups H_{3}C–CH_{2}–CO_{2}–. It is a crystalline colorless solid. It is also called sucrose octapropanoate or octapropionyl sucrose.

== History ==
The preparation of sucrose octapropionate was first described in 1933 by Gerald J. Cox and others.

== Preparation ==
The compound can be prepared by the reaction of sucrose with propionic anhydride in the melt state or at room temperature, over several days, in anhydrous pyridine.

== Properties ==
Sucrose octapropionate is only slightly soluble in water (less than 0.1 g/L) but is soluble in many common organic solvents such as isopropanol and ethanol, from which it can be crystallized by evaporation of the solvent.

The crystalline form melts at 45.4–45.5 °C into a viscous liquid (47.8 poises at 48.9 °C), that becomes a clear glassy solid on cooling, but easily recrystallizes.

The density of the glassy form is 1.185 kg/L (at 20 °C). It is an optically active compound with [α]^{20}_{D} +53°.

The compound can be vacuum distilled at 280–290 °C and 0.05 to 0.07 torr.

== Applications ==
Distillation of fully esterified propionates has been proposed as a method for the separation and identification of sugars.

While the crystallinity of the pure compound prevents its use as a plasticizer it was found that incompletely esterified variants (with 1 to 2 remaining hydroxyls per molecule) will not crystallize, and therefore can be considered for that application.

== See also ==
- Sucrose octaacetate
