= Bitterant =

Additive used to impart a bitter taste

A bitterant is a chemical that is added to a product to make it smell or taste bitter. Bitterants are commonly used as aversive agents to discourage the inhalation or ingestion of toxic substances.

== Examples of use ==
- The addition of a bitterant to ethanol denatures the product.
- Bitterants are used in antifreeze to prevent pet and child poisonings. It is required by law in some places (France, Oregon, etc.).
- Gas dusters often use a bitterant to discourage inhalant abuse, although this can cause problems for legitimate users. The bitterant not only leaves a bitter flavor in the air, but also leaves a bitter residue on objects, like screens and keyboards, that may transfer to hands and cause problems (such as when eating). Similarly, the inclusion of bitterants such as 5% mustard oil in products containing inhalants like toluene have been mandated in some jurisdictions, namely in the Philippines where contact cement abuse by groups such as Rugby boys—a collective term for destitute children and youths addicted to Rugby brand cement by Bostik and similar products—is rampant.
- Game cartridges for the Nintendo Switch are coated with denatonium as a safety feature to deter small children from ingesting them.
- Some button cell batteries manufactured by Duracell are coated with a bitterant to discourage accidental ingestion by children.

== Examples of bitterants ==
- Denatonium is used in a variety of applications as an aversive agent.
- Sucrose octaacetate
- Quercetin
- Brucine
- Quassin

== Bitterness scales ==
The threshold for stimulation of bitter taste by quinine averages a concentration of 8 μM (8 micromolar). The taste thresholds of other bitter substances are rated relative to quinine, which is thus given a reference index of 1. For example, Brucine has an index of 11, is thus perceived as intensely more bitter than quinine, and is detected at a much lower solution threshold. The most bitter substance known is the synthetic chemical denatonium, which has an index of 1,000. It is used as an aversive agent (a bitterant) that is added to toxic substances to prevent accidental ingestion. This was discovered in 1958 during research on lignocaine, a local anesthetic, by MacFarlan Smith of Gorgie, Edinburgh, Scotland.

=== Brewery ===
Beer bitterness scales attempt to rate the perceived relative bitterness of beer. The bitterness of beer is provided by compounds such as isohumulones from hops used during brewing.

The International Bittering Units scale, or simply IBU scale, is measured through the use of a spectrophotometer and solvent extraction. A calculation is performed on this absorbance to give a result in IBU. This technique was adopted at the same time as another method based on measuring the concentration (in milligrams per litre; parts per million w/v) of IAA isomerized α acids in a beer, causing some confusion among small-scale brewers. The American Society of Brewing Chemists, in the introduction to its methods on measuring bitterness, points out some differences between the results of the two methods:

While the results of the IAA methods are practically identical to those obtained by the [I]BU method for beer brewed with fresh hops, the IAAs of beer brewed with old or poorly stored hops, and with certain special hop extracts, can be significantly lower than the [I]BU figure.

The European Bitterness Units scale, often abbreviated as EBU, is a bitterness scale in which lower values are generally "less bitter" and higher values "more bitter". The scale and method are defined by the European Brewery Convention, and the numerical value should be the same as of the International Bitterness Units scale (IBU), defined in co-operation with the American Society of Brewing Chemists. However, the exact process of determining EBU and IBU values differs slightly, which may in theory result with slightly smaller values for EBU than IBU.

IBU cannot be determined by perceived bitterness. For example, the bittering effect of hops is less noticeable in beers with a high quantity of malt, so a higher bitterness is needed in heavier beers to balance the flavour and achieve the same perceived bitterness as compared to a lighter beer. For example, an Imperial Stout may have an IBU of 50, but will taste less bitter than an English Bitter with an IBU of 30, because the latter beer uses much less malt than the former. After around 100 IBU, hop utilization is so poor that the number ceases to be meaningful in regard to taste, although continued hop additions will increase bitterness. Light lagers without much bitterness will generally have 8–20 IBU, while an India Pale Ale may have 60–100 IBU or more.

== See also ==
- Denaturation (food), the deliberate addition of an unpleasantly flavored or poisonous substances to food in order to prevent the consumption of the food for various reasons.
- Adulterant, a substance added to food for deceptive or malicious reasons, for example to cheaply replace legitimate ingredients.
