= Khaliq v HM Advocate =

Khaliq and Anor v HMA was a Scottish criminal case brought in 1983 and decided by the High Court of Justiciary sitting as the Court of Criminal Appeal, in which it was decided that it was an offence at common law to supply materials that were otherwise legal in the knowledge that they would be used for self-harm.

Two shopkeepers in Glasgow were arrested and charged, amongst other offences, with supplying to children "glue-sniffing kits" consisting of a quantity of petroleum-based glue in a plastic bag. They had been previously warned by the police to stop supplying the kits. They gave notice of objection to the indictment, averring that, on the charge of supplying, the facts as libelled did not disclose a crime known to Scots law because there was nothing illegal about the items that they had supplied. Their plea was repelled at a preliminary diet and they appealed.

On appeal, the High Court took the view that, even though Evostik glue and plastic bags might be perfectly legal, everyday items, the two shopkeepers knew perfectly well what the children were going to use the articles for and the charge on the indictment should stand. "The Court refused to accept that there was any distinction between supply with knowledge of likely abuse and actual administration of a dangerous substance to a child."

Said Lord Justice General Emslie: "There is ample authority for the view that the wilful and reckless administration of a dangerous substance to another causing injury or death is a crime at common law in Scotland".

When the case finally came to trial at Glasgow High Court the two were each sentenced to three years' imprisonment.

This case is reported at 1983 SCCR 483 (CCA); 1984 JC 23; 1984 SLT 137.
