= Spirit gum =

Costume glue

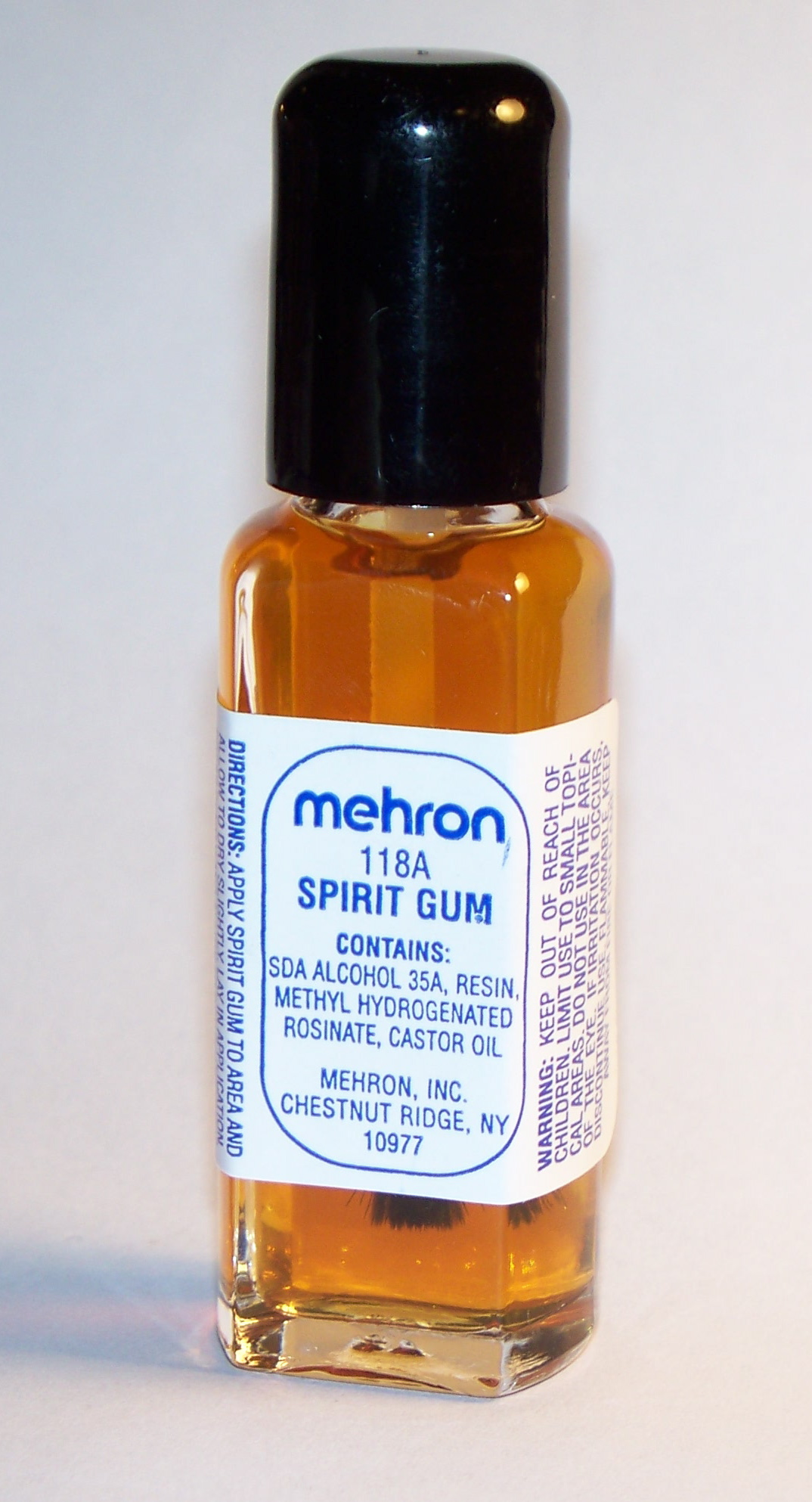
A 3 oz. Bottle of Spirit Gum

Spirit gum is an adhesive, made mostly of SD Alcohol 35-A (the solvent, or "spirit") and resin (the adhesive, or "gum"; it originally consisted of mastic), used primarily for affixing costume prosthetics such as wigs, merkins, or false facial hair. It has been manufactured since at least the 1870s, and has long been a standard tool in theatrical performances, where prosthetic pieces or affixed costuming is used. Spirit gum was mentioned in the earliest known published theatre makeup manual: "How to make-up; a practical guide for amateurs by Haresfoot and Rouge" in 1877. At the end of the nineteenth century, spirit gum could be procured by performers at theatrical wig makers. Removal of the adhesive was usually done with alcohol, cocoa butter or petroleum jelly.
