= SD Alcohol 35-A =

SD Alcohol 35-A is a specially denatured alcohol containing 95.38% ethanol and 4.62% ethyl acetate. Uses of SD Alcohol 35-A include its use as the solvent in spirit gum.
