= Children Underground =

2001 documentary film by Edet Belzberg

- DVD cover
- Directed by: Edet Belzberg
- Produced by: Edet Belzberg
- Starring: Cristina Ionescu; Mihai Alexandru Tudose Ana Turturica Marian Turturica Violeta "Macarena" Rosu
- Cinematography: Wolfgang Held
- Edited by: Jonathan Oppenheim
- Music by: Joel Goodman
- Production company: Belzberg Films
- Distributed by: HBO/Cinemax Documentary Theatrical Presentations; Cinemax Reel Life
- Release date: 19 September 2001
- Running time: 104 minutes
- Language: Romanian

Children Underground is an American 2001 documentary film directed and produced by Edet Belzberg. The film which is set in Bucharest, Romania, explores the lives of five children who are shown trying to survive, fighting, suffering abuse and addiction to Aurolac. This documentary follows the five homeless children in Romania, where the collapse of communism has led to a life on the street for 20,000 children.

== Summary ==
Children Underground follows the story of five street children, aged eight to sixteen who live in a subway station in Bucharest, Romania. The street kids are encountered daily by commuting adults, who pass them by in the station as they starve, swindle, and steal, all while searching desperately for a fresh can of paint to get high with. As the kids panhandle, fight and sleep on cardboard boxes, either on the train platforms or the public parks above ground, they inhale Aurolac, an industrial adhesive used in the construction and repair of teracotta, from plastic bags. Belzberg and her cameraman, Wolfgang Held, maintained their distance whilst filming them.

One of the children that director Belzberg follows is Cristina Ionescu. At first, this child looked like a young man, but one later finds out that girls have to become tough and look boyish in order to survive. This is also very apparent with another child named, Violeta 'Macarena' Rosu, who is also a girl. The nickname 'Macarena' derives from the song "Macarena", her favorite. Three other children, Mihai Tudose, and brother and sister Ana and Marian, are also profiled. The filmmakers also follow Mihai to his family's home in the town of Constanța. A similar scene films Ana and Marian as they visit their home in Sinaia, which is also outside Bucharest.

== Children featured in film ==
Cristina Ionescu: Aged 16, spent her young life in an orphanage where she experienced abuse and beatings. She left the orphanage at age 11 in favor of the streets when they tried to put her in a mental institution. Cristina took on a boyish appearance in order to appear tough, as street girls often face hardships. Cristina is the leader of the subway kids.

Mihai Alexandru Tudose: Aged 12, ran away from home at age 8. Both parents drank and his father was abusive. He misses his sister and mother and feels guilt for leaving them. He wishes to have a skill in life, to own a home and go to school. He refuses to beg like the other children and instead helps shopkeepers stock shelves for payment. He cuts himself after the group travels to a park (Ana has a tantrum and takes it out on him) and shows signs of emotional suffering.

Violeta 'Macarena' Rosu: Aged 14, lived at the same orphanage as Cristina. Cristina protects Macarena who is quiet and submissive. She is addicted to Aurolac more so than the other children. Macarena doesn’t know her real name, her parents or her birthday. The nickname 'Macarena' derives from the song "Macarena", her favourite, which she loves to dance to.

Ana Turturica: Aged 10, ran away from impoverished conditions at home without electricity, food or clothes. She refuses to discuss her home life and says her family loves her and she loves them but it's better this way. After running away, she later returns home, taking her younger brother Marian to stay with her on the streets. Her stepfather attempts to take them home twice but also admits to have "checked" if she was a virgin. Ana is very troubled.

Marian Turturica: Aged 8, is Ana's younger brother. He doesn't like life on the streets and sticks close by his sister's side.

=== Where are they now? ===
The release of the DVD allowed extra insight into the children's situations after the initial re-visiting shown in the film. At 19, Cristina was addicted to heroin and was three months pregnant, showing little hope in being able to give up the drug. Her baby was given to a non-profit adoptive organization and she continued living off of the streets using only the income from her girlfriend's prostitution. In 2013, when she was 32, she and her husband were profiled in an article on homelessness in Romania. She was still addicted to heroin and had had three children, none of whom lived with her. Mihai was taken in by a man in Belgium who spent six months looking for him in Bucharest. For some time, he enjoyed education in general schooling and French language before returning to Bucharest to live with a social worker. Marian, at 12, was taken to a children's shelter after a police sweep of the Piața Victoriei and deemed able for rehabilitation. Ana at 14 was living with her parents after the police threatened to prosecute them for child abandonment.

== Critical reception ==
It currently holds a score of 94% on Rotten Tomatoes based on 17 reviews, with an average rating of 7.53/10. It also has a score of 85 out of 100 on Metacritic, based on 7 critics, indicating "universal acclaim".

Robert Koehler from Variety wrote "It's hard to imagine sadder or more infuriating social conditions than those exposed in tyro documaker Edet Belzberg's astonishing "Children Underground." This verite look at desperately homeless children surviving on the streets and in the subway tunnels of Bucharest will stir debate and emotions.".

== Awards ==
The film has won the Special Jury Prize at the 2001 Sundance Film Festival. It was nominated for the Academy Award for Best Documentary Feature.
