= Hydrocarbon poisoning =

- Other names: Hydrocarbon toxicity, hydrocarbon ingestion
- Specialty: Toxicology
- Treatment: Supportive care

Hydrocarbon poisoning is either the swallowing or breathing in of hydrocarbons. Swallowing hydrocarbons may result in symptoms include coughing or vomiting. Breathing in hydrocarbons may result in low blood oxygen and shortness of breath. Complications may include confusion or seizures.

Hydrocarbons may include gasoline, mineral oil, or paint thinner. Treatment is supportive care. Efforts to empty the stomach are not recommended.
