= Aversive agent =

Aversive agents are unpleasantly flavored substances added to poisonous household goods to discourage children and animals from consuming them. Aversive agents are not intended to be harmful, only unpleasant. For example, to prevent children from consuming poisonous anti-freeze, which has a sweet flavor due to the ethylene glycol, an aversive agent is added, which gives the anti-freeze an unpleasant taste. There are two primary classes of aversive agents: bitterants, chemicals producing a bitter flavor, and pungent agents, chemicals producing an unpleasantly spicy flavor.

== See also ==
- Denaturation (food)
- Adulterant
- Denatonium
