= Impact glue =

Type of adhesive

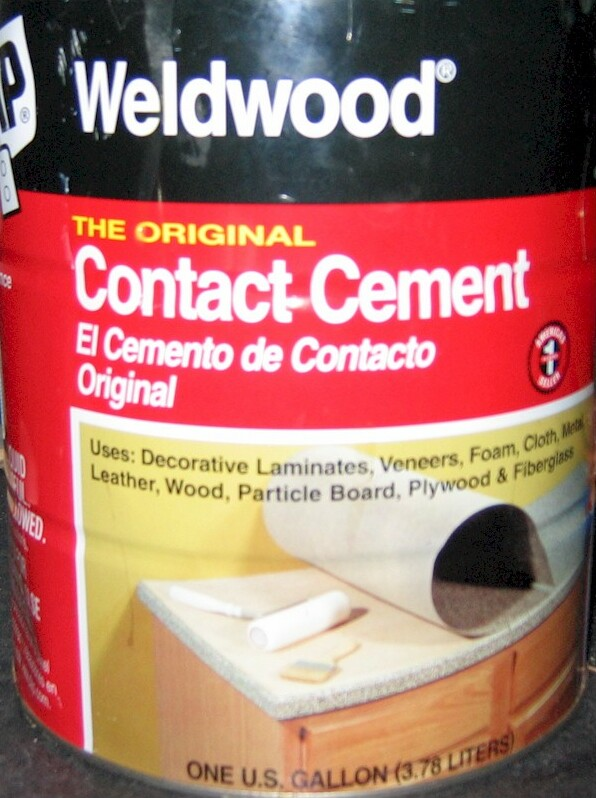
Weldwood Contact-cement, a commercial contact glue

Impact glue, contact glue, contact cement, or neoprene glue is a type of solvent-based adhesive which may be used to bond materials such as plastics, laminates, and metal or wood veneers. The term "contact glue" comes from the practice of applying adhesive to both surfaces to be bonded; the surfaces are joined once the solvent in the adhesive evaporates, leaving a bond with high shear resistance. Contact adhesives do not exclusively designate neoprene adhesives; all adhesives characterized by high instant adhesion may be considered contact adhesives, but the most common among them are solutions of neoprene or rubber.

== Properties ==
Impact glue has a high adhesive capacity, and is particularly failure-resistant compared to other non-reactive adhesives when applied correctly. It is typically applied in thin layers on both materials to be joined. Impact adhesives are used frequently with laminates, such as in bonding Formica to countertops, and in footwear, as in attaching outsoles to uppers. Natural rubber and polychloroprene (Neoprene) are the most commonly used contact adhesives. Both of these elastomers undergo strain crystallization.

Contact adhesives must be applied to both surfaces and allowed some time to dry before the two surfaces are pushed together. Some contact adhesives require as long as 24 hours to dry completely before the surfaces are to be held together. Once the glue is ready, the surfaces are pushed together, and a permanent bond forms very quickly. As the bond forms immediately on contact, there is no need for clamps, as is the case with other adhesives.

Neoprene adhesives exist in two forms: the so-called "liquid" form suitable for horizontal surfaces, and the thixotropic non-flowing "gel" intended for vertical or indoor installation. It may be packed in glue tubes for domestic use, in a pistol cartridge, or in a can for large quantities.

== Inhalation ==
Neoprene glue is a well known inhalant, with effects that range from an alcohol-like intoxication and intense euphoria to vivid hallucinations, depending on the substance and dose. Some inhalant users are injured due to the harmful effects of the solvents or gases or due to other chemicals used in the products that they are inhaling. As with any recreational drug, users can be injured due to dangerous behavior while they are intoxicated, such as driving under the influence. In some cases, users have died from hypoxia (lack of oxygen), pneumonia, cardiac failure or arrest, or aspiration of vomit. Brain damage is typically seen with chronic long-term use of solvents as opposed to short-term exposure.

While legal when used as intended, in England, Scotland, and Wales it is illegal to sell inhalants, including solvent glues, to persons likely to use them as an intoxicant. As of 2017, thirty-seven US states impose criminal penalties on some combination of sale, possession or recreational use of various inhalants. In 15 of these states, such laws apply only to persons under the age of 18.

== Safety ==
Most neoprene glues contain volatile solvents, and the hazards imparted by these solvents must be indicated on the container. Aerosol applications of solvent-containing adhesives are typically more hazardous than liquid or gel forms of the same, though all forms of contact glue are recommended for use only in well-ventilated areas and away from sources of ignition.

== Bibliography ==
- Ebnesajjad, Sina (2010). "History of Adhesives". Handbook of Adhesives and Surface Preparation:Technology, Applications and Manufacturing. Amsterdam: Elsevier. ISBN 9781437744613.
- Kinloch, Anthony J. (1987). Adhesion and Adhesives: Science and Technology. London: Chapman and Hall. ISBN 041227440X
- Lau, John H.; Wong, C. P.; Lee, Ning-Cheng; Lee, S. W. Ricky (2002). Electronics Manufacturing: With Lead-free, Halogen-free, and Conductive-adhesive Materials. McGraw-Hill Professional. ISBN 978-0-07-138624-1.
- Mittal, K.L., A. Pizzi (2003). Handbook of Adhesive Technology. New York: Marcel Dekker. ISBN 0824709861
- Todd, Robert H.; Allen, Dell K.; Alting, Leo (1994). Manufacturing Processes Reference Guide. Industrial Press Inc. ISBN 0-8311-3049-0.
