= Debt compliance =

Measure to ensure debtors honor their debts

In finance, the term debt compliance describes various legal measures taken to ensure that debtors, whether individuals, businesses, or governments, honor their debts and make an honest effort to repay the money that they owe.

Generally regarded as a subdivision of tax law, debt compliance is most often enforced through a combination of audits and legal restrictions. For example, a provision of the Federal Debt Collection Procedures Act of 1990 states that a person or organization indebted to the United States, against whom a judgment lien has been filed, is ineligible to receive a government grant. Noncompliance, depending on severity and frequency, may be punished by fine or even incarceration in debtor's prison.

Auditors may issue debt compliance letters stating that they have reviewed the financial covenants of a loan agreement as part of auditing a company's financial statements, and that they are not aware of any matters suggesting that the company is not in compliance with the specific terms of that agreement.
