= Ultra trust =

In United States trust law, an Ultra Trust is a registered trademark whose intellectual property is owned by Estate Street Partners LLC. It describes a specific type of intentionally defective grantor-type irrevocable trust that includes an independent trustee, as well as a special limited power of appointment. Unlike general powers of appointment, a special limited power of appointment within the Ultra Trust is limited to specific person(s) who retain the benefit of the power (grantor) from the person in whom the power is vested (trustee). Generally, Ultra Trusts are used to reposition all types of assets for purposes of asset protection, as an Ultra Trust offers the ability to have an independent third party own assets previously owned by the grantor.

An Ultra Trust is a legal entity with special provisions, benefits, and limitations created and drafted by an attorney who has expertise in debtor—creditor law, income tax law, gift tax law, estate tax law, as well as trust law. The purpose of an Ultra Trust is to reposition assets from a person's legal ownership to limit one's exposure to potential future liabilities.

The Ultra Trust legal entity is created with these legal principles:

1. With respect to an irrevocable trust, a creditor of the grantor may reach the maximum amount that can be distributed to or for the grantor's benefit.

2. A grantor can retain special limited powers of appointment without subjecting the assets owned by the Ultra Trust to creditors claims.

3. Estate Street Partners advocates that subsequent to the structure of the Ultra Trust is set up, that a full market value consideration exchange is created to transfer or exchange property into the trust should be executed.

The grantor achieves benefits by retaining a special limited power of appointment: (1) The grantor or any third party can gift or exchange unlimited assets to the trust at any time, (2) the assets held by the trust may be entitled to a step-up in basis, (3) the grantor pays the trust's income and capital gains taxes on assets owned by the trust, allowing the trust to grow tax free, (4) the grantor can put any domestic or foreign asset into the trust including LLC Membership Units, S-Corp shares, C-Corp shares, life insurance, CD's, cash-like instruments, real estate, and a personal residence while retaining all the tax benefits of home ownership if remaining a grantor-type trust.

The Ultra Trust is a legal agreement. Its ability to achieve a particular goal or outcome is highly dependent upon the expertise of the author of such legal agreement and an individual's specific circumstances. An amateur should never attempt to draft one without the assistance of an expert.
