= Transmutation agreement =

Separation of spouses' property

A transmutation agreement is a postnuptial agreement that changes the character of the spouses’ property from community to separate, or vice versa. It may be used to change the character of property to be acquired in the future, as well as property that the spouses own at the time of the agreement. Spouses are free to alter the character of property in this manner, provided that all statutory requirements are met. The principal limitation on transmutation agreements between spouses is that (i) they must be fair and based on full disclosure of the pertinent facts, and (ii) they must not be a fraudulent transfer of assets.

While postnuptial agreements are generally subject to the same notice and recording rules as premarital agreements, the rules for transmutation agreements are slightly different. A transmutation of real property is not effective with respect to third parties who are without notice of the transmutation unless the transmutation instrument is recorded. While recording is not a prerequisite to the validity of the transmutation as between the spouses, it is a prerequisite in making the transmutation effective with respect to third parties who are otherwise without notice. This requirement is consistent with the fact that transmutations are subject to the laws governing fraudulent transfers.

== Tax effects ==
Transmutation agreements have certain tax implications. For income tax purposes, if spouses file a joint return, then characterization of property as community or separate is irrelevant, as all income is aggregated. However, if spouses file a separate return, then each spouse must report his or her one-half share of community income, and his or her separate income. Because transmutation agreements change the nature of the property (including earnings and other income), they have the greatest income tax impact on separate tax returns.

Transfers of property between spouses are generally nonrecognition events for income tax purposes, as they are always considered to be gifts with carryover basis. There are a couple of exceptions: (i) transfer to a spouse who is a nonresident alien at the time of the transfer; (ii) transfer in trust, to the extent that the sum of the liabilities assumed, plus the liabilities to which the property is subject, exceeds the total adjusted basis of the property; or (iii) transfer in trust, of an installment obligation.

The more important tax aspect of a transmutation agreement is the effect that it has on basis step-up (or step-down) at death. If the spouses had held the property separately in joint tenancy with a right of survivorship, the surviving spouse would automatically receive his or her half of the property by operation of law through the original joint tenancy title, and not through inheritance or any other type of succession after death. Consequently, his or her basis would not be stepped up if the property has appreciated, but instead would remain at the original cost basis.

Thus, while transmutation agreements are generally desirable from an asset protection standpoint, they may have adverse tax consequences, because of the loss of one-half of basis step up. This can be offset by the fact that spouses may enter into a transmutation agreement at any time, during marriage. Accordingly, while the spouses are working or practicing their profession (and they are exposed to risks) they can enter into a transmutation agreement and transfer certain assets to the low-risk spouse. When the spouses retire and risks dissipate, the spouses can enter into another transmutation agreement and convert their separate property back to community, regaining the full step up.
