= Nuptial agreement =

Nuptial Agreement may refer to:

- Prenuptial agreement, a contract entered into prior to marriage or civil union.
- Postnuptial agreement, similar to a prenuptial but executed after a couple gets married.
