= Henry Brill =

American psychiatrist and educator

Henry Brill (October 6, 1906 – June 17, 1990) was an American psychiatrist and educator. A native of Bridgeport, Connecticut, he earned both his undergraduate and medical degrees from Yale University. After receiving his M.D. in 1932, he began a career in the New York state psychiatric system, culminating in the directorship of Pilgrim Psychiatric Center in Brentwood, NY from 1958 to 1976. At its height in the mid-1950s, Pilgrim was the largest mental institution in the world, with a census of 13,875 patients. Brill also served as Deputy Commissioner of the New York State Department of Mental Hygiene from 1959 to 1964.

Brill was a leader in the early use of the tranquilizer chlorpromazine (Thorazine) in the United States for the treatment of psychosis, having heard of its success in France and Canada in the early 1950s. After being contacted directly by the drug's U.S. distributor, Smith Kline & French, Brill convened a meeting of New York psychiatrists in 1953 to discuss the benefits of chlorpromazine use in the public sector psychiatric hospital system. Shortly thereafter, New York became the first state to use the new medication in its hospitals on a large scale. Following several successful pilot tests in 1954, the introduction of chlorpromazine for general use in the patient population in January 1955 led to the first decrease in the New York state psychiatric hospital census during peacetime, as described in analyses published by Brill and Robert Patton in 1957. The advent of wide antipsychotic medication use in the public psychiatric hospital systems of the United States was a key factor in the eventual rise of the deinstitutionalization movement in the 1960s.

Brill was the chairman of the American Psychiatric Association Committee on Nomenclature and Statistics from 1960 to 1965 and was notable for supporting committee member Robert Spitzer's efforts to discontinue the classification of homosexuality as a mental disorder in the Diagnostic and Statistical Manual of Mental Disorders 2nd Edition (DSM-II). Brill also served as a member of the 1970s National Commission on Marihuana and Drug Abuse (the Shafer Commission), which recommended decriminalizing marijuana because it was not harmful. This advice was rejected by President Nixon and ignored by Congress for more than 50 years.
