= Anabolic Steroids Control Act of 1990 =

U.S. federal legislation

The Anabolic Steroids Control Act of 1990 (Pub. L. 101–647, 104 Stat. 4851, enacted November 29, 1990) is a United States federal law that placed anabolic steroids under Schedule III of the Controlled Substances Act (CSA). The legislation also amended the Controlled Substances Act by defining anabolic steroids as "any drug or hormonal substance, chemically and pharmacologically related to testosterone (other than estrogens, progestins, and corticosteroids) that promotes muscle growth", regulated human growth hormone, and established criminal penalties for their non-medical use and distribution of the substances. The Act was passed as Title XIX of the larger Crime Control Act of 1990.

== History ==
During the early 1980s, concerns about systemic drug use in athletics, particularly within the Olympics, prompted heightened anti-doping efforts. However, these concerns did not immediately lead to legislative actions addressing the broader availability and misuse of steroids. Throughout the decade, reports of health risks associated with steroid use and ethical issues surrounding their impact on fair competition in sports began to garner public and political attention.

In the mid-1980s, regulatory changes significantly affected the availability of anabolic steroids. A 20-year drug review campaign led by the U.S. Food and Drug Administration (FDA) resulted in the removal of all anabolic steroids from the pharmaceutical market. This action led to the discontinuation of several previously available compounds, which had been widely used for both medical and non-medical purposes. These regulatory measures coincided with the expansion of an illicit market for steroids.

In May 1987, the U.S. Attorney's Office announced a federal indictment targeting 36 individuals involved in what was then the largest known anabolic steroid trafficking network in the country. Over the course of a two-year investigation, federal authorities uncovered a black market operation valued at $100 million, spanning nationwide. Key figures alleged to have been involved included David Jenkins, an Olympic silver medalist; Dan Duchaine, a bodybuilder and author and expert on steroids; and an aeronautical engineer. Soon after, the Anti-Drug Abuse Act of 1988 was passed by Congress, which attempted to enhance penalties for those convicted of trafficking anabolic steroids.

Representative William J. Hughes of New Jersey introduced the Anabolic Steroids Control Act of 1990 as H.R. 5269 on April 26, 1990, which sought to expand control of anabolic steroids by classifying them as controlled substances. Prior to 1990, anabolic steroids were not classified as federally controlled substances in the United States. Proponents of the legislation emphasized the need to curb the illicit trade and protect public health, citing the FDA's earlier actions as insufficient to address what was seen as a growing problem; however, the bill faced opposition from several organizations, including the American Medical Association (AMA) and Drug Enforcement Administration (DEA).

The law was amended by the Anabolic Steroid Control Act of 2004, which redefined anabolic steroids under the Controlled Substances Act, listed specific substances as anabolic steroids, and allowed exemptions for compounds with no significant abuse potential. It also mandated updates to Federal sentencing guidelines, encouraged educational programs about the dangers of steroid use, and included steroid-related questions in national drug surveys.

The law was again amended by the Designer Anabolic Steroid Control Act of 2014, which expanded the list of anabolic steroids regulated by the DEA to include about two dozen new substances and established new crimes relating to false labeling of steroids. The law established a penalty of up to $500,000 against those found to be falsely labeling their anabolic steroid products.
