= Child Protection Restoration and Penalties Enhancement Act of 1990 =

Part of 1990 United States Act of Congress

The Child Protection Restoration and Penalties Enhancement Act of 1990, Title III of the Crime Control Act of 1990, Pub. L. 101–647, 104 Stat. 4789, enacted November 29, 1990, S. 3266, is part of a United States Act of Congress which amended 18 U.S.C. § 2257 in respect to record-keeping requirements as set by the Child Protection and Obscenity Enforcement Act of 1988, also establishing prohibitions. The Act also amended 18 U.S.C. § 2243 and 18 U.S.C. § 2252 establishing and increasing penalties for sexual abuse of a minor. Also see Child Protective Services, for global practices and the approach of US.

== History ==
The initial version of 2257 as passed in the 1988 Child Protection and Obscenity Enforcement Act of 1988, mandated that producers of pornographic material keep records of the age and identity of performers and affix statements as to the location of the records to depictions. However, rather than penalties for noncompliance, the statute created a contradictable presumption that the performer was a minor. This version was struck down as unconstitutional under the First Amendment in American Library Association v. Thornburgh . In this case the constitutionality of the Act was scrutinized before district court for the District of Columbia. This lawsuit was initiated by the producers and distributors of books, magazines, and films. The court found record-keeping provisions burdensome in terms of right to produce regarding materials protected by the First Amendment. The court also mentioned that the Act was not precisely designed to advocate governmental interest of stopping child pornography. Since the Act did not include particular sanction neither for failure to keep nor complete the records. Another unconstitutional aspect of the Act was criminal presumptions. The court mentioned that these provisions failed to comply with constitution because they created a strong possibility for convicting innocent persons who had not engaged in child pornography. And this was a contradiction with the due process right of the accused to be assumed innocent until proven guilty. Also see,

In part, the Child Protection Restoration and Penalties Enhancement Act of 1990 was designed to "correct[] the record keeping provisions of the Child Pornography and Obscenity Enforcement Act so that it will comply with a U.S. district court's decision in the case of American Library Association versus Thornburgh."

According to the Bill's summary, apart from removing the unconstitutional provision, it was also intended:

- To amend the Child Protection and Obscenity Enforcement Act of 1988 in order to:
  - Prohibit: (1) The sale or transfer of any pornographic material lacking a statement of the location of records with respect to the performance depicted on every copy; or (2) failing to create or maintain records or to comply with provisions of such Act or from knowingly making a false entry or failing to make an appropriate entry in such records.
  - Establish criminal penalties for violations of such act and replace the term "lascivious exhibitions of genitals or public areas" for "sexually explicit conduct" for purposes of sexual exploitation provisions.
- Direct the U.S. Sentencing Commission to amend guidelines for sentences involving sexual crimes against children so that more substantial penalties may be imposed if the Commission determined that former penalties were inadequate.
- Increases the maximum penalty for sexual abuse of a minor from 5 to 15 years imprisonment.
- Establish penalties for: (1) possessing with intent to sale any visual depiction of sexually explicit conduct involving minors; and (2) possessing three or more materials containing such depictions (excluding depictions by words alone). Limits on the amount of fines for such possession and for other activities were eliminated.

The Child Protection Restoration and Penalties Enhancement Act of 1990 was composed of two subtitles.

- "Subtitle A—Restoration of Recordkeeping Requirements" amended 18 U.S.C. § 2257 by striking out and replacing subsections (d) and (e) and inserting subsections (f), (g), (h) and (i). 18 U.S.C. § 2257 itself was added by the Child Protection and Obscenity Enforcement Act of 1988.
- "Subtitle B—Sexual Abuse Penalties" amended 18 U.S.C. § 2243 subsection (a), and 18 U.S.C. § 2252 subsections (a) and (b).

== Legal challenges ==
After the amendments, the same Plaintiffs whose claims resulted in the determination of the unconstitutionality of the Child Protection and Obscenity Enforcement Act of 1988, challenged again the constitutionality of 18 U.S.C. § 2257 as amended by the Child Protection Restoration and Penalties Enhancement Act of 1990 in the case named American Library Association v. Reno. However, by the time of the hearing before the court, the Congress had corrected the Act through legislation. The court reversed District Court's decision. United States Court of Appeals for the District of Columbia Circuit concluded that the Act was a content-neutral statute that serves a compelling Government interest; and its provisions met the intermediate scrutiny standard established by the Supreme Court's First Amendment jurisprudence.

The Court upheld this new version and considered it to be a "content-neutral statute that serves a compelling Government interest", therefore finding that said provisions "meet the intermediate scrutiny standard established by the Supreme Court's First Amendment jurisprudence". In 2010 the constitutionality of 18 U.S.C.S. §§ 2257, 2257A, age verification and recordkeeping statutes designed to deter child pornography was challenged before United States District Court for the Eastern District of Pennsylvania in Free Speech Coalition, Inc. v. Holder. In this case the court discussed the balance between the sexual exploitation of children in the production of pornography and infringement of the right of free speech guaranteed by the Constitution. Plaintiffs, producers and distributors of sexually explicit material, indicated chill out effect that was allegedly created by provisions on recordkeeping and the deterrence child pornography and thus the Act was infringing First Amendment rights.

The court held that "to the extent producers have any reasonable expectation of privacy in age-verification records relating to depictions of sexually explicit conduct, that expectation is reduced". The court also noted that government's interest in preventing sexual exploitation of children in the production of such depictions. According to court producers of such depictions are aware that their records will periodically be inspected by government officials. And Congress has both authorized inspections and created rules.

Upon this legal challenges some sources recommend that virtual child pornography should be regulated from a different perspective. It is suggested that this category should be evaluated in terms of obscene speech. By doing so, It can be distinguished from child pornography depicting actual children in a more proper and constitutional manner.
