= Michael Sonnenreich =

American lawyer

Michael R. Sonnenreich
- Born: Michael Roy Sonnenreich; May 5, 1938 (age 88); New York City, U.S.
- Education: University of Wisconsin (BA) & (BS); University of Madrid, Spain (Certificate of Matriculation); Harvard University (LL.B./JD)
- Occupations: Lawyer, businessman, investor
- Years active: (1960s–present)
- Known for: Co-creating the Controlled Substances Act
- Children: 2

Michael Roy Sonnenreich (IPA: [zɔnənʁaɪç] saw-nen-reich; born May 5, 1938) is an American lawyer, art collector, and a philanthropist who previously worked in technology, pharmaceutical, and global marketing. He is notable for co-creating the Controlled Substances Act while serving as the executive director of the Shafer Commission.

Sonnenreich is the chairman of the board of Kikaku America International, President of The Fund to Conserve United States Diplomatic Treasures Abroad (a privately funded sub-division of the State Department), and Vice Chairman of PharMa International Corporation in Tokyo, Japan. He also served as a former adjunct professor of law at the University of Virginia, University of California, Los Angeles, and Southern Methodist University.

== Early life ==
=== Childhood ===
Sonnenreich was born on May 5, 1938, in Manhattan, New York. He is the son of late Emanuel Hirsch and Fay Rosenberg Sonnenreich. He attended Bronx High School of Science in the early 1950s.

== Career ==
=== Government ===
Sonnenreich served from 1963 to 1965 as a Second Lieutenant in the military and was honorably discharged. After Sonnenreich graduated from Harvard Law and passed the D.C. bar exam, he started serving in the Department of Justices' criminal law division for a few years. Then, Sonnenreich had transferred to the Bureau of Narcotics and Dangerous Drugs (a division of the Department of Justice) as Deputy Chief Counsel from 1969 to 1971, and was later appointed by President Nixon to be the executive director of the National Commission on Marijuana and Drug Abuse / Shafer Commission from 1971 to 1973. While there, with the help of his friend White House Counsel head John Dean and the Director of the BNDD John Ingersoll, they formulated the Controlled Substances Act. He was also President of the National Coordinating Council on Drug Education from 1973 to 1974. While working at the Supreme Court, Sonnenreich became a partner at his own firm Sonnenreich & Roccograndi in Washington, DC, specializing in International Business, Drug Law, Pharmaceutical Regulation. He terminated his law firm partnership after joining Sackler's personal legal cohort.

=== Relations with Arthur M. Sackler ===
While working in the Bureau of Narcotics and Dangerous Drugs, Sonnenreich prosecuted supreme court cases against psychiatrist Arthur Sackler concerning Betadine, Senaflax, Librium and Valium. Although on opposite sides of these cases, Sackler approached Sonnenreich to join his legal team. Sonnenreich at the time wanted to stay "with the government" and did not want to work directly for Sackler; years later however, Sonnenreich accepted his job offer. Sonnenreich worked with Sackler for more than a decade. Sackler gave Sonnenreich the ability to control his assets and stocks while working for him. When Sackler died in 1987, Sonnenreich helped establish the Arthur M. Sackler Gallery at the (Freer Gallery of Art/Smithsonian Institution) and the Smithsonian National Museum of African Art to preserve some of both their art collections.

=== Later career ===
Sonnenreich has served as a board member and trustee of many companies, among them Wi2Wi, Tyhee Development Corp. Ltd., Scientific American, and Medical Tribune International. Sonnenreich was president of the Washington National Opera from 1996 to 1998 and again from 2002 to 2006. He was chairman of the DC Jazz Festival (2010–2014) and commissioner of the DC Commission on the Arts and Humanities (2008–2011). Secretary Glickman and Sonnenreich lead the international conference on government regulation and the world food supply in 1997, while Sonnenreich was on the board at Tufts University and Johns Hopkins University. In 2007, Sonnenreich "used his extensive Rolodex (and uncanny political abilities) to help free a group of jailed workers employed in an American factory in Asia, thereby averting the shut-down of that company's operations," prompting a reconciliation with the host government.

=== Recognition ===
In 2008, he was named Distinguished Washingtonian by the University Club of Washington, DC. Also, the Washington Life Magazine listed Michael Sonnenreich in the Power 100 three consecutive times, occurring in 2007, 2008, and 2009.
