= Shafer Commission =

United States commission

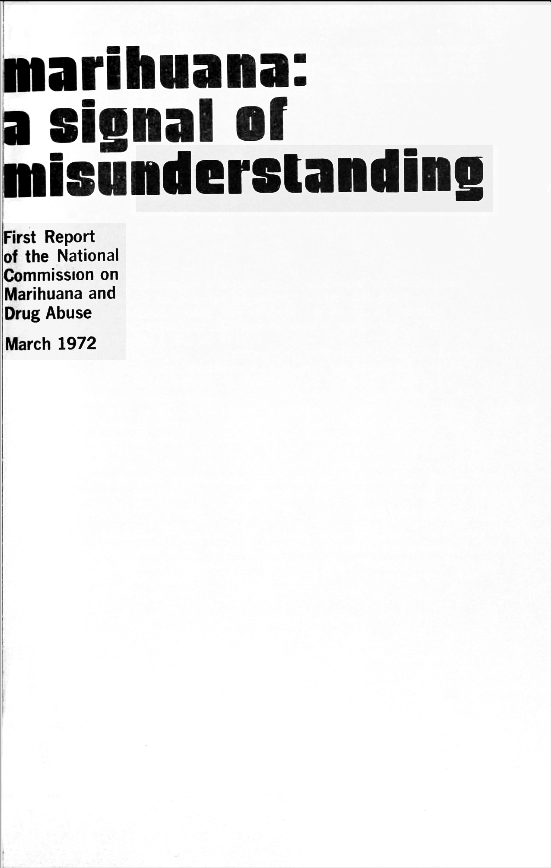
- Cover page of the Shafer Report
- Type: Commission
- Chair: Raymond P. Shafer

The Shafer Commission, formally known as the National Commission on Marijuana and Drug Abuse, was appointed by U.S. President Richard Nixon in the early 1970s. Its chairman was former Pennsylvania Governor Raymond P. Shafer. The commission issued a report on its findings in 1972 that called for the decriminalization of marijuana possession in the United States. The report was ignored by the federal government and the Congress, but is an important document against prohibition.

While the Controlled Substances Act was being drafted in a House committee in 1970, Assistant Secretary of Health Roger O. Egeberg had recommended that marijuana temporarily be placed in Schedule I, the most restrictive category of drugs, pending the Commission's report. On March 22, 1972, the Commission's chairman, Raymond P. Shafer, presented a report to Congress and the public entitled Marihuana: a Signal of Misunderstanding, which favored ending marijuana prohibition and adopting other methods to discourage use. The report was republished as a Signet Books New American Library paperback in 1972.

The Commission's report said that while public sentiment tended to view marijuana users as dangerous, they actually found users to be more timid, drowsy and passive. It concluded that cannabis did not cause widespread danger to society. It recommended using social measures other than criminalization to discourage use. It compared the situation of cannabis to that of alcohol.

The Commission's proposed decriminalization of marijuana possession was opposed, in 1974, by the recommendations of a congressional subcommittee chaired by Senator James Eastland.

Congress nor the Nixon administration did not implement the recommendations from the National Commission on Marihuana and Drug Abuse. However, the report has frequently been cited by individuals supporting removal of cannabis from Schedule I of the Controlled Substances Act.

== Members ==
- Michael R. Sonnenreich served as Executive Director of the Commission.
- Raymond P. Shafer, former Governor of Pennsylvania (Chairman)
- Dana L. Farnsworth, MD, chairman of the University of Michigan department of pharmacology (Vice Chairman)
- Henry Brill, MD, psychiatrist
- Tim Lee Carter, U.S. Representative (R–KY)
- Joan Ganz Cooney, television producer
- Charles O. Galvin, SJD, Dean of SMU Law School
- John A. Howard, PhD, President of Rockford University
- Harold E. Hughes, U.S. Senator (D–IA)
- Jacob K. Javits, U.S. Senator (R–NY)
- Paul G. Rogers, U.S. Representative (D–FL)
- Maurice H. Seevers, MD, PhD
- J. Thomas Ungerleider, MD, psychiatrist
- Mitchell Ware, JD, attorney
