= Asset protection =

Body of statutory and common law

Asset protection (sometimes also referred to as debtor-creditor law) is a set of legal techniques and a body of statutory and common law dealing with protecting assets of individuals and business entities from civil money judgments. The goal of asset protection planning is to insulate assets from claims of creditors without perjury or tax evasion.

Asset protection consists of methods available to protect assets from liabilities arising elsewhere. It should not be confused with limiting liability, which concerns the ability to stop or constrain liability to the asset or activity from which it arises. Assets that are shielded from creditors by law are few: common examples include some home equity, certain retirement plans and interests in LLCs and limited partnerships (and even these are not always unreachable). Assets that are almost always unreachable are those to which one does not hold legal title. In many cases it is possible to vest legal title to personal assets in a trust, an agent or a nominee, while retaining all the control of the assets. The goal of asset protection is similar to bankruptcy, and the two practice areas go hand-in-hand. When a debtor has none to few assets, the bankruptcy route is preferable. When the debtor has significant assets, asset protection may be more sensible.

The four threshold factors that are either expressly or implicitly analyzed in each asset protection case are:

- The identity of the person engaging in asset protection planning
  - If the debtor is an individual, does he or she have a spouse, and is the spouse also liable? If the spouse is not liable, is it possible to enter into a transmutation agreement? Are the spouses engaged in activities that are equally likely to result in lawsuits or is one spouse more likely to be sued than the other?
  - If the debtor is an entity, did an individual guarantee the entity's debt? How likely is it that the creditor will be able to pierce the corporate veil or otherwise get the assets of the individual owners? Is there a statute that renders the individual personally liable for the obligations of the entity?
- The nature of the claim
  - Are there specific claims or the asset protection is taken as a result of a desire to insulate from lawsuits?
  - If the claim has been reduced to a judgement, what assets does the judgement encumber?
  - Is the claim dischargeable?
  - What is the statute of limitations for bringing the claim?
- The identity of the creditor
  - How aggressive is the creditor?
  - Is the creditor a government agency? Taxing authority? Some government agencies possess powers of seizure that other government agencies do not.
- The nature of the assets
  - To what extent are the assets exempt from the claims of the creditors? For example, the degree of protection offered by the homestead exemption, the exemption of the assets in a qualified plan, i.e. assets in a plan under the Employee Retirement Income Security Act (ERISA) etc.

Whilst the aforementioned use of Trusts will be of benefit in a number of cases the question of ownership can still arise, as although legal ownership may have been transferred to the trustees, beneficial ownership may still in many cases lie with the settler of the Trust. A Private Placement Life Insurance contract (PPLI), can provide a greater degree of protection and privacy than most Trusts, and can also be integrated with an existing trust if necessary. Whilst Trusts may not be recognised in many Jurisdictions, Life insurance also has the advantage of being Multi jurisdictional.

Another Multi jurisdictional approach for asset protection are the various digital inheritance services.

== United States legislation ==
United States federal bankruptcy laws and ERISA laws exempt certain assets from creditors, including certain retirement plans. All fifty states also have laws that exempt certain assets from creditors. These vary from state to state, but they often include exemptions for a certain amount of equity in a personal residence, individual retirement accounts, clothing, or other personal property.

All fifty U.S. states also have laws that protect the owners of a corporation, limited partnership, or limited liability company from the liabilities of the entity. Many states limit the remedies of a creditor of a limited partner or a member in an LLC, thereby providing some protection for the assets of the entity from the creditors of a member.

All fifty U.S. states provide some protection for the assets of a trust against the creditors of the beneficiaries. Some states allow asset protection for a self-settled trust (a trust in which the settlor or creator of the trust is included as a potential discretionary beneficiary) and some states do not.

Creditors have several tools to overcome the laws that provide asset protection. First, there are federal and state fraudulent transfer laws. Today there are two bodies of fraudulent transfer law: the Bankruptcy Code and state fraudulent transfer statutes. Most states have adopted Uniform Fraudulent Transfer Act which defines what constitutes a fraudulent transfer. The UFTA and the Bankruptcy Code both provide that a transfer made by a debtor is fraudulent as to a creditor if the debtor made the transfer with the "actual intention to hinder, delay or defraud" any creditor of the debtor. While UFTA applies clearly to present creditors, the distinction between a future creditor and a future potential creditor is not as clear. The UFTA is commonly held to apply only to future creditors and not to future potential creditors (those whose claim arises after the transfer, but there was no foreseeable connection between the creditor and the debtor at the time of the transfer).

There are also laws which allow a creditor to pierce the corporate veil of an entity and go after the owners for the debts of the entity. It may also be possible for a creditor of a member to reach the assets of an entity through a constructive trust claim, or a claim for a reverse piercing of a corporate veil.

The anti-alienation provision of the Employee Retirement Income Security Act of 1974 (ERISA) exempts from claims of creditors the assets of pension, profit-sharing, or 401(k) plans. Two exceptions are carved out for qualified domestic relations orders and claims under the Federal Debt Collection Procedures Act of 1990. Because the protection is set forth in a federal statute, it will trump any state fraudulent transfer law. Protection of ERISA is afforded to employees only and does not cover employers. The owner of a business is treated as an employer, even though he may also be the employee of the same business, as in a closely held corporation. Accordingly, ERISA protection does not apply to sole proprietors, to one owner business, whether incorporated or unincorporated, and to partnerships, unless the plan covers employees other than the owners, partners and their spouses.

Asset protection planning requires a working knowledge of federal and state exemption laws, federal and state bankruptcy laws, federal and state tax laws, the comparative laws of many jurisdictions (onshore and offshore), choice of law principles, in addition to the laws of trusts, estates, corporations and business entities. The process of asset protection planning involves assessing the facts, circumstances, and objectives of an individual, evaluating the pros and cons of the various options, designing a structure that is most likely to accomplish all the objectives of the individual (including asset protection objectives), preparing legal documents to carry out the plan, and ensuring that the various legal entities are operated properly in accordance with the laws and the objectives of the individual. This process involves providing legal advice and legal work and most states prohibit the practice of law without a license.

== History ==
Asset protection planning began to develop as a stand-alone area of the law in the late 1970s. It began coming into prominence in the late 1980s, with the advent and the marketing of offshore asset protection trusts. Colorado attorney Barry Engel is credited with the introduction of that concept and the development of asset protection trust law statutes in the Cook Islands. The most distinctive feature of the offshore trust is the fact that the settlor or creator of the trust may be included among the potential beneficiaries of the trust without causing the assets of the trust to be subject to the creditors of the settlor. This is often referred to as a "self-settled trust."

Over the years, this new field of law enjoyed a marginal reputation, but started going mainstream in the mid-1990s. A 2003 article in The Wall Street Journal claimed that 60% of America's millionaires have considered engaging in asset protection planning.

Choice of law rules in the United States make it possible for a person from any state to create a trust, corporation, limited partnership or limited liability company that is governed by the laws of any other state or jurisdiction. Because of this ability to "forum shop," various states and other jurisdictions have modified their laws to allow greater asset protection in order to make them competitive with other jurisdictions.

In most states, the assets of a self-settled trust are not protected from the creditors of the settlor. In 1997, Alaska passed a statute which provided that the assets of an Alaska self-settled trust are not subject to the creditors of the settlor. Since 1997, the following states have adopted legislation allowing for a self-settled asset protection trust: Nevada, Delaware, South Dakota, Wyoming, Tennessee, Utah, Oklahoma, Colorado, Missouri, Rhode Island and New Hampshire. This legislation created a favorable offshore asset protection trust jurisdiction also for non-US settlors.

There is considerable debate about the comparative effectiveness of the asset protection provided by the laws of each jurisdiction, onshore and offshore. Similarly, the asset protection features provided by corporations, limited partnerships and limited liability companies vary from jurisdiction to jurisdiction. Once again, Alaska's limited liability company statute provides innovative advantages over other states. Case law from North Carolina demonstrates the asset protection advantages of a transfer to a limited liability company (see Herring v. Keasler, 150 NC App 598 (01-1000) 06/04/2002).

Just as the Cook Islands have developed a reputation for the best offshore jurisdiction for an asset protection trust, Nevis stands out in the competition for the best jurisdiction to file a limited liability company. The Nevis limited liability company statute is based on the Delaware limited liability statute, but they have a few added advantages. One advantage of a Nevis LLC is that the members and managers are not disclosed to the public.

There is some debate over the ethics of asset protection planning. On one hand, every attorney that creates a trust, corporation, limited partnership, or limited liability company is engaging in some form of asset protection planning. On the other hand, most would agree that it is ethically inappropriate to assist a person to commit fraud or evade income taxes. The timing and the purposes of the plan seem to be the determinative factors as to whether a plan will be considered ethically and legally appropriate. In some cases, individuals have gone to jail for contempt of court for failing to unwind a plan that a judge felt was repugnant to the principles of law and justice, however in those cases the individuals incarcerated retained some control over their plan immediately prior to, or during, litigation.
