= Drug Trafficking Safe Harbor Elimination Act =

Proposed United States bill

The Drug Trafficking Safe Harbor Elimination Act was a bill proposed to the 112th United States Congress in 2011. It was introduced to amend Section 846 of the Controlled Substances Act to close a loophole that has allowed many drug trafficking conspirators to avoid federal prosecution. The Drug Trafficking Safe Harbor Elimination Act would have made it a federal crime for persons who conspire on United States soil to traffic or aid and abet drug trafficking inside or even outside the borders of the United States. This Act was created to provide clarity to current laws within the United States and provide criminal prosecution of those who are involved in drug trafficking within the United States or outside its borders. This Act would have provided a borderless application to United States Law and extends possible criminal charges to all individuals involved in the drug transport. The bill passed the House but was not acted upon by the Senate and thus died.

== History ==
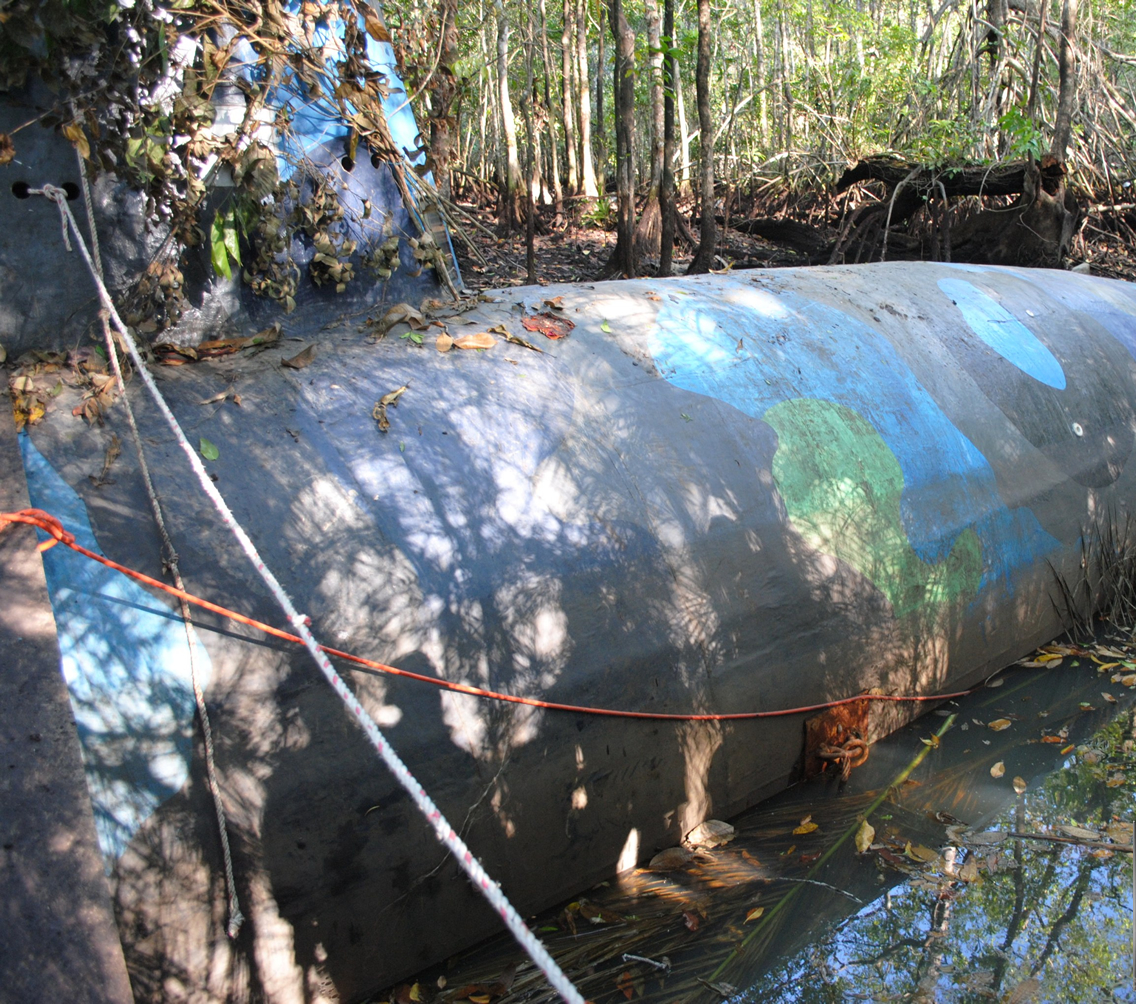
Narco submarine seized in Ecuador 2010-07-02 8

The Drug Trafficking Safe Harbor Elimination Act was introduced to the House on January 18, 2011 by Representative Lamar S. Smith of Texas and Representative Adam B. Schiff of California. The proposed Drug Trafficking Safe Harbor Elimination Act, also known as H.R.131, would make it a federal crime for persons who conspire on United States soil or traffic outside the borders of the United States, as well as engage in conduct such as aiding or abetting. These criminal actions would be in violation of the current legislation under the Controlled Substances Act. The Act is to amend Section 846 within the Controlled Substances Act and is legally defined as, "Anyone who enters into a conspiracy to traffic or possess a controlled substance outside the United States or who aids and abets others in such crime within the United States, shall be subject to the same charges or penalties that would apply to conduct if it were to occur within the United States." This Act will not include a simple possession of a controlled substance." This amendment to the Controlled Substances Act is to "clarify conspiracies conducted within the United States which may lead to criminal prosecution of those involved within the United States."

The section within the Controlled Substances Act that is to be amended is Section 846. This Section, entitled Offenses and Penalties (21 U.S.C. 846) legally states that, "Any person who attempts or conspires to commit any offense defined in this 'subchapter' shall be subject to the same penalties as those prescribed for the offense, the commission of which was the object of the attempt or conspiracy." The Drug Trafficking Safe Harbor Elimination Act, if passed, will insert: ‘"(a)" before "Any"; and insert "Whoever, within the United States, conspires with one or more persons, or aids or abets one or more persons, regardless of where such other persons are located, to engage in conduct at any place outside the United States that would constitute a violation of this title if committed within the United States, shall be subject to the same penalties that would apply to such conduct if it were to occur within the United States." This Act will close a current loophole in the Controlled Substances Act that has limited prosecution and regulation. Prior to this act, there was no punishment for individuals who were on United States soil who conspired to traffic drugs outside the borders into other countries. Several cases throughout the history of the United States have been dismissed due to the current Controlled Substances Act not covering conspiring or trafficking outside the United States through collaboration on United States soil.

The Drug Trafficking Safe Harbor Elimination Act provides a borderless application to the current Federal drug conspiracy and trafficking statute. The act, if passed, is intended to decrease crimes including conspiracy and drug trafficking while attempting to secure United States borders. Supporters report that this act will provide clarity in prosecution regarding conspiracy by persons within the United States, as well as persons who engage within the United States to aid or abet drug trafficking outside of the countries borders. The act itself is to reduce the involvement on United States soil in the ever increasing and borderless drug problem. This small change in the wording regarding the Controlled Substances Act provides clarity to past gray areas.

In the United States, there have been many legislative actions and agencies to regulate and prevent drug trafficking on United States soil. The United States Department of Homeland Security has a division for International Drug Trafficking that coordinates with various departments to attempt to prevent drug movement, especially those targeted to enter the United States. With this Act, these agencies will obtain increased boundaries in detention of possible conspirators and individuals who assist the transport. Currently, the Federal Maritime Drug Law Enforcement Act focuses on the transport of illegal substances on international waters. This Act focuses on water vessels, such as submarines, which are increasing in use. These vessels are used to help drug traffickers reach their destination on waters that are often unregulated. Congress reported that the increase in these vessels and the increase in drug trafficking creates a threat to the well being and the security of the United States. The use of these types of vessels are universally unacceptable, but difficult to regulate.

== Legislation background and cases ==
The United Nations Office on Drugs and Crime reports that cocaine is typically transported to the United States by water vessels from Colombia to Mexico or Central America. At this time, cocaine from Colombia remains the primary source for Europe and other countries. Coordinating the transports takes preparation of the many individuals involved. From 1998 to 2009, seizures of cocaine, heroin, morphine, and cannabis have almost doubled. Further analysis shows that ATS (Amphetamine-Type Substances) have doubled in the same time frame. The United Nations Office on Drugs and Crime in 2009 stated that approximately "149 and 272 million people or 3.3% to 6.1%" of the population from ages 15 to 64, used an illicit substance at least once in the previous year. With this data, legislation and agencies are attempting to deter and decrease the market for illegal drug use by strict punishments.

The United States and other organized international agencies have battled drug-related crimes throughout history. The first legislation against drug trafficking was passed in 1848 when an act known as, Drug Importation Act, was passed. This act allowed United States Customs to inspect drugs entering the United States from overseas. This came as one of the first attempts of interception and prevent any misuse or markets. Since then legislation has had to become more precise in narrowing the gray areas within the law and international concerns. Congress expresses that the reasoning behind the Drug Trafficking Safe Harbor Elimination Act is because trafficking drugs

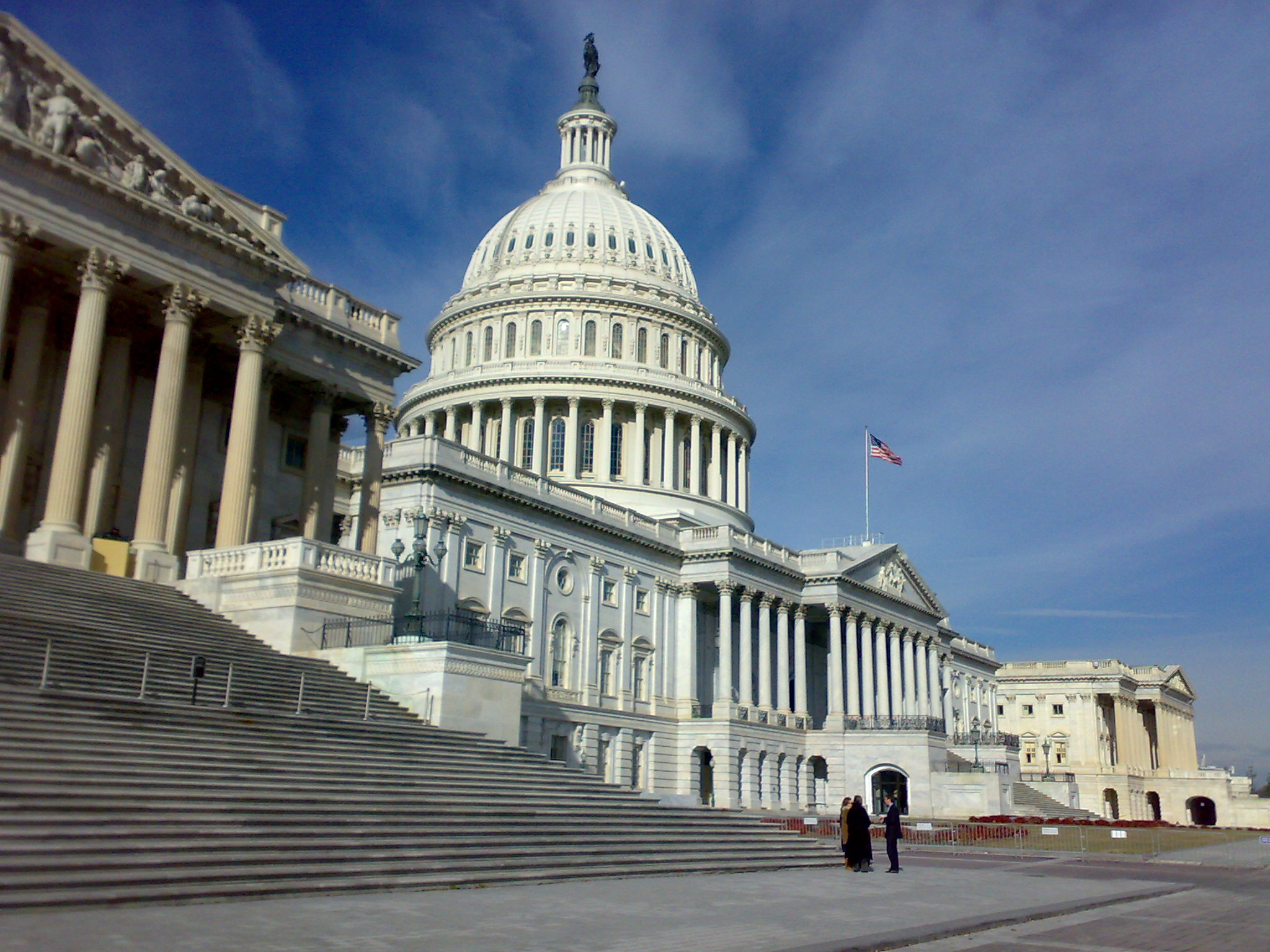
US Congress 02

or conspiring to traffic, is a threat to the United States' security and to the well-being of United States citizens. Data from a survey in 1991 shows that participates, ages 18 to 49, who reported use of illegal drugs such as marijuana or cocaine were much more likely to commit crimes than those who did not use. This study also showed that 26.1% of those interviewed in 1991 and used cannabis, alcohol, and/or cocaine had committed a violent crime during the last year. There is a proven link that shows a strong correlation between illicit drug use and crime. Often these criminal acts are committed to obtain goods or money to support the drug habit. Thus, increasing concern for legislation to continue to look for possible solutions.

The United States not only focuses on its borders, it focuses beyond its soil in attempts to prevent what eventually will enter the country. The United States has a total of three drug treaties that extend internationally. The first treaty, known as the 1961 Single Convention on Narcotic Drugs which was amended in 1972 and gave power and influence in the control of drugs nationally. The second treaty came along in 1971, known as the Convention on Psychotropic Substances, which covered new drugs that came out in the 1970s, like LSD and other hallucinogens. The initial two treaties were an attempt to secure the availability of drugs for scientific and medical purposes only, thus, diverting illegal trade. Each of these treaties included sections on trafficking and drug scheduling and information. The third treaty was introduced in 1988 and is entitled the Illicit Traffic in Narcotic Drugs and Psychotropic Substances. This treaty provided more details concerning related crime and extended law in attempts to detour drug-related crimes, such as money laundering or drug trafficking precursors. Each of these treaties concentrated efforts in attempting to prevent or decrease the number of drug-related crimes within the United States and beyond.

The introduction of the Drug Trafficking Safe Harbor Elimination Act, stems from the same goal of regulation and prevention of drug trafficking throughout United States and throughout the world. The most prominent case that is used to support the Drug Trafficking Safe Harbor Elimination Act occurred in 1998. The conspiracy occurred between two individuals who coordinated the trafficking of 2,000 kilograms of cocaine from South America to Europe. With assistance from a Saudi Arabian Prince, Nayef bin Fawwaz Al Sha'lan, who allowed the drugs to be transported by his private jet and a large Colombian drug trafficking organization, these two individuals helped move approximately $100 million of cocaine. The co-conspirators met for collaboration while in Miami, Florida, to purchase the cocaine from the Colombian drug organization and to transport it to Europe. Law enforcement in France and Spain intercepted the cocaine, but approximately 1,000 kilograms had already been sold in the Netherlands and Italy, as well as other locations throughout Europe. In 2005, the two conspirators in what became the Lopez-Vanegas case, were convicted of conspiracy and drug trafficking by a Florida Federal District Court. Both of the co-conspirators were sentenced to 24 years in prison. In 2007, the Court of Appeals vacated the convictions and determined no violation of Federal law had occurred since when the conspiracy to possess and distribute occurred it was outside the United States. This became the case that provided support for an amendment to the Controlled Substances Act to occur since the collaboration of the conspiracy to traffic occurred while on United States soil in Miami, Florida.

== Controlled Substances Act ==
Comparison of the perceived harm for 20 popular recreational drugs from a poll among medical psychiatrists specialized in addiction treatment.

The Controlled Substances Act of 1970, formally known as title II Pub. L. 91-513, was implemented on October 27, 1970 to control and regulate both prescribed and illegal substances. Although, the Act has been amended several times since it was implemented, it has been the building block of drug legislation within the United States. The Controlled Substances Act of 1970 was created to regulate medications which can lead to abuse or dependency if used incorrectly. With the creation of five classifications of Scheduled drugs and detailed policy, the Controlled Substances Act attempted to regulate and control any importation, distribution, or manufacturing.

In 1970, a total of five schedule categories were established within the Controlled Substances Act. Once established, these schedule categories would be reexamined twice annually to update the substances and to be republished to be used by agencies. Each substance is placed into a category by determining the quantity and consistency of each individual substance. The following are the five scheduled categories:

1. A Schedule I drug is listed as a substance that has a high risk for abuse and is not accepted as safe or for treatment by the medical community. According to the DEA List of Scheduled Substances, examples of a Schedule I Drug are: heroin, lysergic acid diethylamide (LSD), marijuana, peyote, and methylenedioxymethamphetamine.

2. A Schedule II drug is listed as another drug for high abuse risk. This scheduled drug has been used for medical treatment under medical supervision, but can lead to dependency or mental health issues. According to the DEA List of Scheduled Substances, examples include: morphine and opium, methadone, meperidine, oxycodone, and fentanyl. Schedule II also includes stimulants such as amphetamine, methamphetamine, cocaine, and pentobarbital.

3. A Schedule III drug is listed as a substance that has a lesser risk for abuse compared to scheduled I and II. This category is used in medical treatment within the United States and has a moderate or low risk of physical or mental dependence. According to the DEA List of Scheduled Substances, examples include: Suboxone, benzphetamine, ketamine, and less than 15 milligrams of hydrocodone.

4. A Schedule IV drug is listed as having a lower risk for abuse compared to scheduled III and is used in medical treatment within the United States. This category has a lower risk of physical or mental health dependence compared to scheduled III. According to the DEA List of Scheduled Substances, examples include: Darvocet, Alprazolam, Clonazepam, and Valium.

5. A Schedule V drug is listed as low risk for abuse compared to scheduled IV and is used in medical treatment within the United States. This category has lower risk for physical and mental health dependence when compared to scheduled IV. According to the DEA List of Scheduled Substances, examples include: Phenergan, Cough medication containing no more than 200 milligrams of codeine such as Robitussin.

Section 846 of the Controlled Substances Act focuses on conspiracy. This section states that "any" person who attempts or conspires to commit any offense defined in this section shall be subject to the same penalties as those prescribed for the offense, the commission of which was the object of the attempt or conspiracy. In 1988, Section 846 was amended by substituting the section beginning with "shall" and replacing it with "is punishable by imprisonment or fine or both which may not exceed the maximum punishment prescribed for the offense." The conspiracy provision, 21 U.S.C Sec. 846, under the Controlled Substances Act subjects conspirators to the same penalties as those prescribed for the offense. The Controlled Substances Act has several mandatory minimum penalties, for example, "5 years imprisonment for distribution or possession with intent to distribute one gram of LSD, 100 marijuana plants, 28 grams of crack cocaine, 500 grams of powder cocaine, 100 grams of heroin, five grams of pure methamphetamine, 50 grams of a methamphetamine mixture, ten grams of PCP, and 100 grams of a PCP mixture. Ten-year sentences are mandatory for ten grams of LSD, 1000 marijuana plants, 280 grams of crack cocaine, five kilos of powder cocaine, one kilo of heroin, 50 grams of pure methamphetamine, 500 grams of a methamphetamine mixture, 100 grams of PCP, and one kilo of a PCP mixture."

== Federal drug sentencing ==
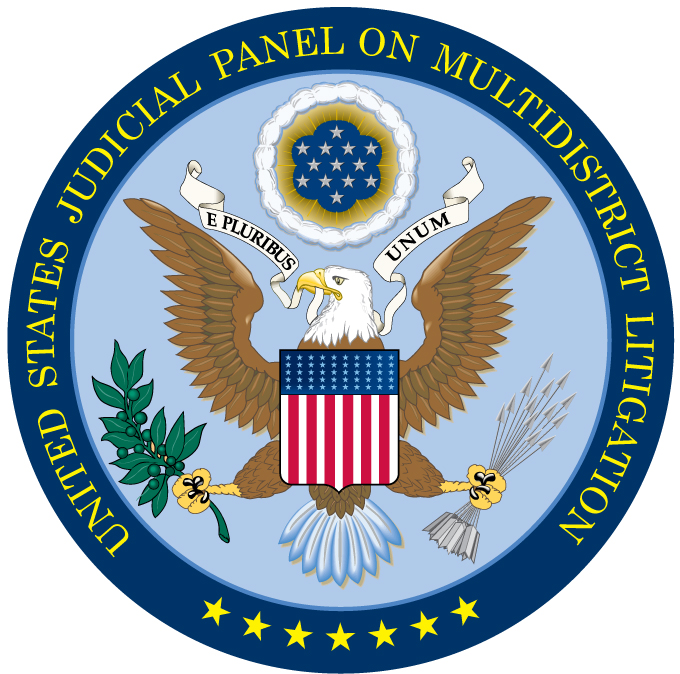
USJPML Seal

The Drug Trafficking Safe Harbor Elimination Act is one of many amendments to legislation that has occurred throughout United States history in attempts to close loopholes and provide clarity to laws. The sentencing for this Act, if passed, will fall under the Controlled Substances Act and sentencing of these federal offenders will be determined by Sentencing Guidelines. The United States uses what is known as the Federal Sentencing Guidelines to determine appropriate ranges of sentencing for offenders convicted of federal crimes. Crimes similar in nature are similar in their sentencing, but now the history of the offender and crime details are also examined. The United States Sentencing Commission was created by the Sentencing Reform Act (SRA) to work within the Judicial Branch of the United States government to create policies and practices regarding sentencing for the Federal Courts. This includes the sentencing guidelines to be examined to determine appropriate punishments for offenders convicted of federal crimes. The United States Sentencing Commission also works with both the Executive Branch and the Judiciary to create effective policy to prevent crime by analyzing data regarding crime rates and sentencing issues. Initially, defendants around the country challenged the constitutionality of the Commission and the Sentencing Reform Act on the violation of the separation of powers doctrine and improper legislation delegation. In 1989, the United States Supreme Court rejected the defendants' challenge in what is known as Mistretta v. United States, and determined that the Commission was constitutional even if it was an independent branch of the Judiciary System. Once this decision by the Supreme Court was clear, implementation of the guidelines spread throughout the United States.

== Controversy ==
Opposition and controversy surround this act and many opposers are rallying together to attempt to stop its passing. It is estimated that the current federal prison population is approximately 206,786 inmates. According to data analysis, this has increased by five times since the mandatory minimums and guidelines became federal law. One reason for this increase is the changes in mandatory guidelines and sentencing. At one time, a drug trafficking conviction would be approximately 23 months. In 2001, after the guideline change, this 23-month sentence was increased to 73 months. It was estimated that 75% of this increase was a result of the mandatory minimums and 25% was a result of the guideline increase above mandatory minimum levels. Opponents currently report that the average sentence for a drug trafficking charge will eventually be increased to approximately 83.6 months, which is higher than in 2001.

Opposers of this act feel that the limitless borders of this legislation will create an increase in federal convictions and provide more authority to prosecution and law enforcement. They report that the Drug Trafficking Safe Harbor Elimination Act should not include distribution offenses. It is argued that distribution charges, when compared to other federal drug trafficking offenses, usually lead to lower penalties. By including distribution, opposers feel that this will not only increase the drug trafficking and conspiracy rates, but an increase in distribution federal convictions will occur as well. The first is what is known as Simple Possession. Simple Possession is defined as the amount that is owned by the individual and likely used by that individual alone. The second offense is entitled Possession with Intent to Distribute (PWID) and is defined as the actual manufacturing, cultivation, resale, and importation of an illegal substance. Laws regarding drugs and distribution throughout the world vary from country to country. Concern with this Act lies in that prosecution of the conspiracies may occur on United States soil, however, the distribution may be legal where the actual distribution occurs. A commonly used example is the distribution of medical marijuana throughout the world.

The Drug Trafficking Safe Harbor Elimination Act has been criticized by many organizations including FAMM, Families Against Mandatory Minimums. FAMM reports that their objections to this act derive from what they predict as incarceration increases and the ultimate costs to United States taxpayers. FAMM opposes the Act due to the sentenced mandatories and the increased number in possible convictions. Federal mandatory minimum penalties continue to be a concern in regards to financial strain and fair sentencing.

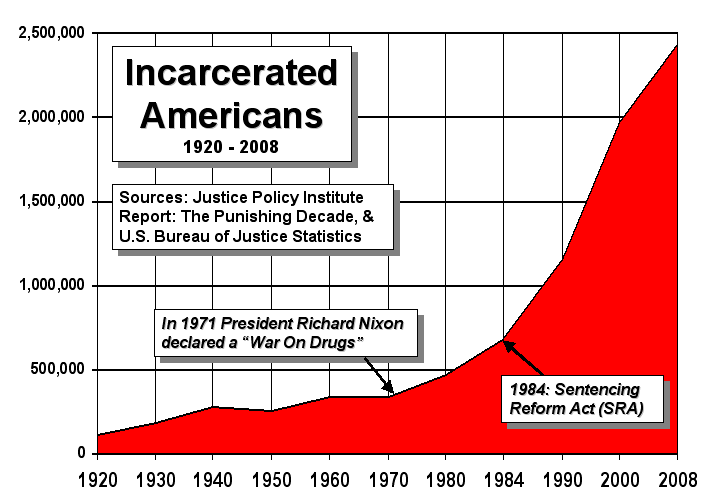
US incarceration timeline

In 2008, 21,023 individuals were sentenced for 31,239 counts of conviction at the mandatory minimum sentence and had an average individual cost of $28,000 annually. Opponents report that mandatory minimums often lead to individuals serving sentences that are too long for the crime they committed. Opposers report that this type of bill allows prosecutors discretion in whom they charge even when the crimes are being committed by complex drug distributors. Some opposers report that this new bill could lead to charges for those individuals who visit Amsterdam, Netherlands and purchase marijuana. One example would be those involved in an Amsterdam wedding and would extend to anyone who participates with the planning of the wedding and the planned purchase of cannabis. These charges could lead to convictions in Federal Court. Supporters see this type of act as a crime and something that could bring harm to the individuals involved and ultimately affect the security of the United States.

Supporters respond to the opposition that the Congressional Budget Office predicted that although the Drug Trafficking Safe Harbor Elimination Act would increase costs in court proceedings, law enforcement, and prisons, would not be as significant as opposition reports. This act is only expected to apply to a small number of new cases and was created to prosecute those who aid in the trafficking conspiracies. In fact, supporters used data analysis showing that the fines that could be collected through criminal fines would not be significant either. The Congressional Budget Office determined that the annual costs could not completely be determined at this time. It was also not determined if the Act would exceed the annual thresholds established in Unfunded Mandates Reform Act (UMRA) that limits intergovernmental mandates to $71 million and $142 million for private-sector mandates which are adjusted for inflation.
