= Washington National Opera =

American opera company

The Washington National Opera (WNO) is an American opera company based in Washington, D.C. The company was founded in 1956 as the Opera Society of Washington, renamed the Washington Opera in 1977, and designated by Congress as the national opera company in 2000. From 1971 to 2025, its performances were given in the opera house of the John F. Kennedy Center for the Performing Arts.

== History ==
=== The Opera Society of Washington ===
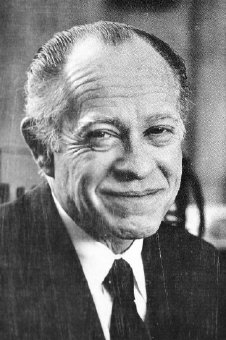
Paul Callaway

Opera in Washington, D.C., was established after World War I, and a Washington National Opera Association flourished into the 1960s, sponsoring performances in various outdoor venues. The Opera Society of Washington was established in 1956 by Day Thorpe, the music critic of the Washington Star, which was at the time the city's most influential newspaper. Paul Callaway, the choirmaster and organist of the Washington National Cathedral, was its first music director. In the company's early years, Thorpe and Callaway generally eschewed cuts to the scores, performances of opera in English translation, expensive scenery, "fat sopranos", and "self-centered tenors". One critic wrote, "There was no 'company' in the literal sense. Each production had to be conceived, planned, and arranged individually, and financial support had to be scraped up opera by opera. Improvisation was the order of the day".

Gregory and Peggy Smith provided $10,000 as seed money for a production of Mozart's Die Entführung aus dem Serail, which would be performed after their summer season by the Washington Symphony Orchestra, conducted by Callaway. Die Entführung opened on 31 January 1957 in George Washington University's Lisner Auditorium, a small venue with limited facilities.

==== The first decade ====
Four months later, the Society staged a double bill of Gian Carlo Menotti's opera The Old Maid and the Thief and his ballet The Unicorn, The Gorgon, and the Manticore. It was successful with the public and critics alike. Successful presentations followed from November 1957: Fidelio; Ariadne auf Naxos; Idomeneo; a double bill of Schoenberg's Erwartung and Stravinsky's Le Rossignol (conducted by the composer); and a December 1961 The Magic Flute which resulted in an invitation from President John F. Kennedy at the White House for some excerpts from the opera.

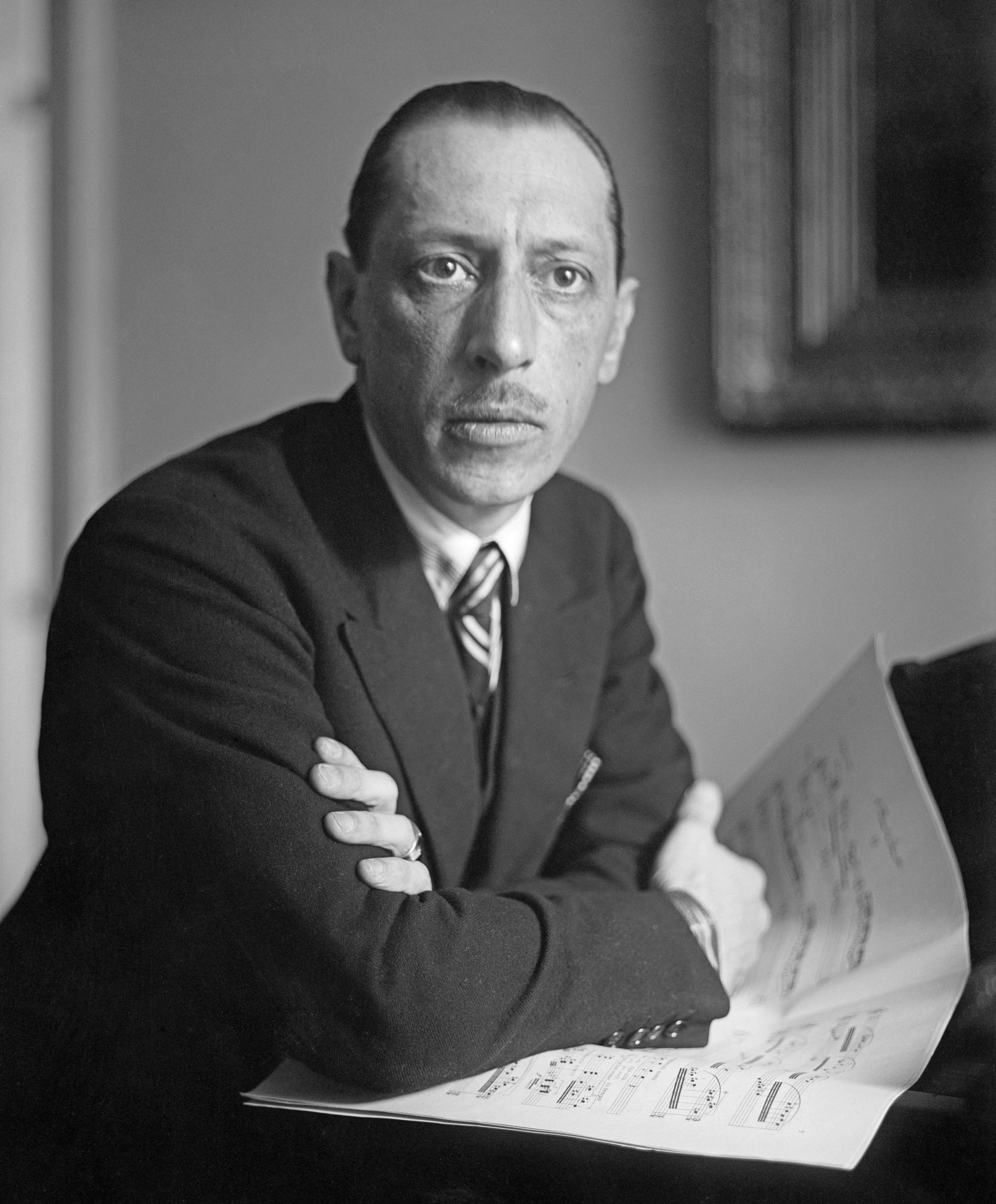
Igor Stravinsky

By this time, the attention of the national press had been caught. A December 1958 Newsweek full-page article on the company was headlined "Sparkle on the Potomac", and Howard Taubman of The New York Times visited regularly, followed by headlines reading "Capital Revival".

However, there was not always such clear sailing, and the company experienced ups and downs in the first few years of the 1960s. Initially, there was further success: bringing Igor Stravinsky to Washington was the work of Bliss Hebert, then the Artistic Administrator of the Santa Fe Opera, who had been involved in that company's early years when the composer regularly visited Santa Fe. However, the first Stravinsky production – The Rake's Progress – was "the most "ill-starred" opera in the Society's history", largely the result of singers' illnesses. A later double bill of Stravinsky conducting Le Rossignol (along with Schoenberg's Erwartung) was a triumph.

However, as the 1960s progressed, further disasters were to follow. These included "a fiasco of unforgivable proportions", an English-language The Magic Flute which caused Callaway's resignation. Some drastic measures were called for.

==== Changes in direction, 1966 to 1977 ====
Three new faces brought "imagination and flair to the company" during the period up to 1977 and, by that date, another new face made a short but dramatic appearance in the company's history: bass-baritone George London became general manager.

Taking over as general manager in 1967 was Richard Pearlman, under whose tenure were staged well-received productions of The Turn of the Screw, La bohème, and the first production of Barber's Vanessa. By 1972, Ian Strasfogel, with considerable experience from working at the Metropolitan Opera, took over the helm with the aim of giving it a "businesslike foundation" "it never had in its sixteen years, in spite of the excellent productions it has often achieved".

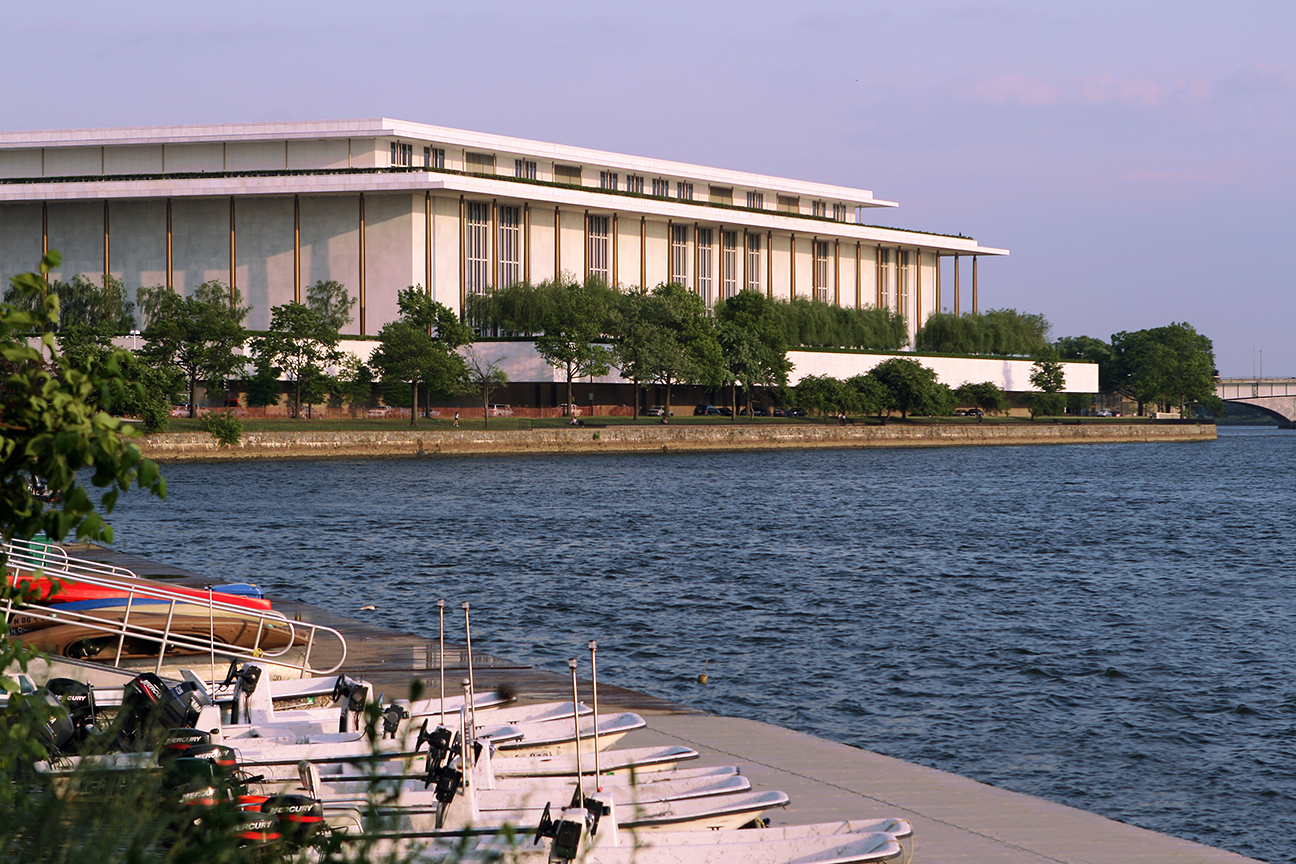
Kennedy Center

One early success was a production of Kurt Weill's Rise and Fall of the City of Mahagonny; the composer's widow, Lotte Lenya, described it as "the best production she has ever seen".

Author Mary Jane Phillips-Matz wrote that Strasfogel's "main achievement" was "his artistic oversight, for by the mid-1970s critics were regularly covering the Opera Society's extraordinary programming and grants were coming in from important foundations."

Stage director Frank Rizzo joined in the 1970s. There followed a stunning Madama Butterfly and other important productions and his association with the company continued into the 1980s. In 1984, he added the Canadian Opera Company's surtitles system that projected an English translation above the proscenium arch.

In 1972, the Opera Society moved to the new Kennedy Center for the Performing Arts. London became the center's Artistic Administrator and then Executive Director of the Nation Opera Institute. He directed a production of Die Walküre for the opera company in 1974 and was courted to become General Director for the 1977 season.

=== The Washington Opera ===
==== George London, 1977 ====
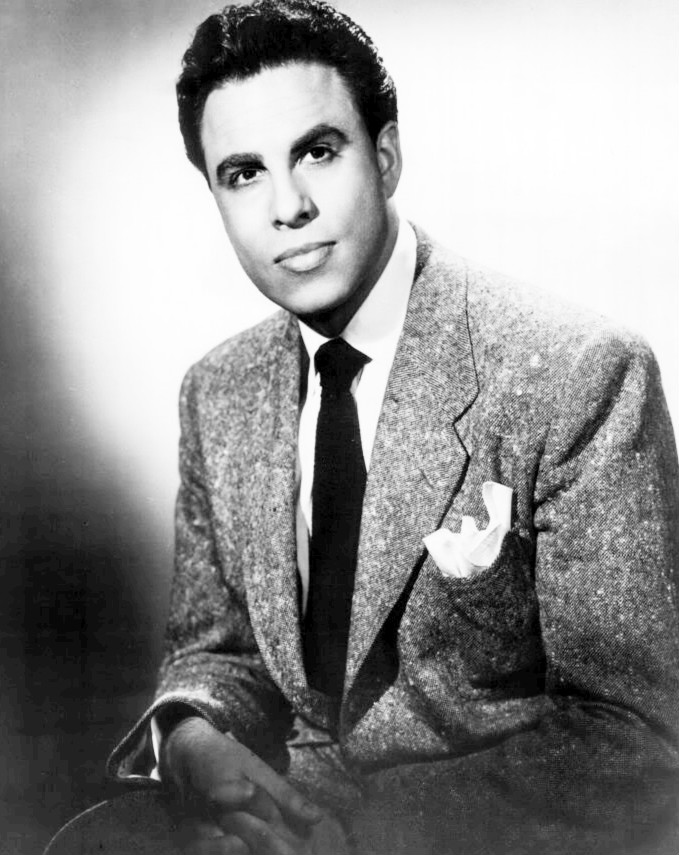
George London in 1952

London ran a fiscally sound company with packed houses, reduced its deficit by two-thirds, and mounted exciting productions such as the city's first Thaïs in 1976. He also renamed the company, as announced in The Washington Post on 13 May 1977. Phillips-Matz wrote that "at this point in the company's history, the programming was smart, varied, and exciting". But progress was suddenly brought to a halt when London had a heart attack in July 1977. Phillips-Matz wrote that "by giving it a new name, a fresh image, and a lot of heft, he brought the company into the national and international opera scene and put it on the road to top rank of producing organizations."

==== Martin Feinstein, 1980 to 1996 ====
Martin Feinstein succeeded London as General Director from 1980 to 1995 and "spent the next 16 years luring artists of the stature of Gian Carlo Menotti (who directed La Boheme), Daniel Barenboim (who conducted Così fan tutte) and Plácido Domingo (who debuted in Washington in 1986 with Menotti's Goya). Feinstein brought in many young singers long before their first appearances at the Metropolitan Opera. His initiative began a Washington Opera tradition of cultivating young talent. Singers nurtured through the program include Vyacheslav Polozov, Jerry Hadley and Denyce Graves, while in 1992, he brought recently retired Berlin State Opera maestro Heinz Fricke to the Washington Opera as music director.

Feinstein led a "dramatic expansion" of the number of performances per season, ultimately increasing annual ticket sales from 32,000 to more than 100,000. By 1995, seats at the Kennedy Center were "almost as scarce" as football tickets, and "usually cost more", the Washington Post reported.

Other leaders of the era included Edward Purrington, who became Artistic Administrator in 1987.

In 1996, Feinstein was succeeded by Patricia Fleischer Mossel, who in 1984 had assumed the new position of director of Development, Marketing, and Public Relations, in charge of company revenues and donations.

=== Washington National Opera ===
==== Plácido Domingo, 2000 to 2011 ====
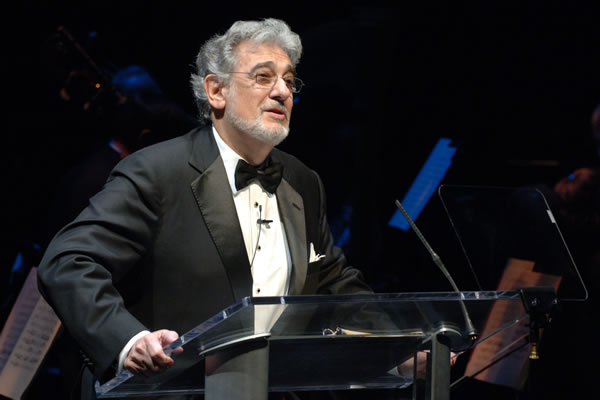
Plácido Domingo in 2008

In 2000, Mossel was succeeded by Plácido Domingo, whose affiliation with the opera company had begun in 1986, when he appeared in its world premiere production of Menotti's Goya, followed by performances in a production of Tosca in the 1988/89 season.

During Domingo's tenure, because of "the company's solid reputation in the United States" and with the help of the opera's then-president, (Michael Sonnenreich), a bill was sponsored and passed in 2000 in the US Congress "designating the company as America's 'National Opera' ".

In February 2004, the company changed its name to the Washington National Opera.

The Washington National Opera performed Richard Wagner's four-opera Der Ring des Nibelungen cycle over the course of the 2006 to 2010 seasons. Having begun planning ''The American Ring'' in 2002, it mounted Das Rheingold in 2006, Die Walküre in 2007, and Siegfried in 2009. It postponed the fourth opera, Götterdämmerung, until 2010 because of the Great Recession.

During the 2007/08 season, WNO produced three rarely staged operas: William Bolcom's A View from the Bridge, G.F. Handel's Tamerlano, and Richard Strauss' Elektra. During the following season Gaetano Donizetti's Lucrezia Borgia and Benjamin Britten's Peter Grimes were given, while the 2009-2010 season featured Richard Strauss' Ariadne auf Naxos and Ambroise Thomas' Hamlet.

Domingo stepped down in 2011.

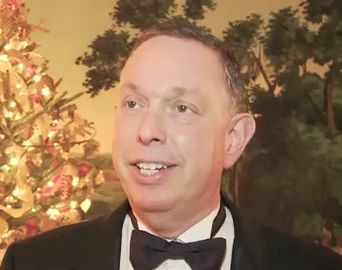
Kennedy Center's Michael Kaiser, 2009

==== Kennedy Center affiliation ====
When WNO agreed to affiliate with the Kennedy Center, it became a branch of the center. The center's president, Michael Kaiser, said this would enable the opera company to mount more productions while saving on costs and payroll. He also said the affiliation would enable WNO to mount newer or less prominent operas in spaces smaller than the opera house. "I would like to bring in some really good avant-garde opera from abroad," Kaiser said in 2011. He expected that the company would increase its productions, back to seven or eight a year.

In May 2011, the company announced the appointment of Francesca Zambello as artistic advisor, and of the then-administrator of the company, Michael Mael, as executive director.

May 2012 brought the Washington premiere of Giuseppe Verdi's Nabucco, directed by the rising star Thaddeus Strassberger, who set the production in 1842 in Milan, where the opera had its world premiere.

The 2014/15 season brought three 20-minute operas as part of its American Opera Initiative: The Investment by John Liberatore, Daughters of the Bloody Duke by Jake Runestad, and An American Man by Rene Orth. The American Opera Initiative later produced works such as Penny by Douglas Pew and Proving Up by Missy Mazzoli.

Since 2013, the American Opera Initiative has commissioned emerging composers to write new operas, including Carlos Simon, Nicolas Lell Benavides, Gity Razaz, and Frances Pollock.

In June 2017, Mael concluded his tenure with the company. The company's music director, Philippe Auguin, served in the post from 2010 to 2018. In September 2017, the company announced the appointment of Timothy O'Leary as its next general director, effective 1 July 2018.

In September 2018, the company extended Zambello's contract as artistic director by three years, and announced the appointment of Evan Rogister as principal conductor with an initial contract through the 2021-2022 season. Rogister stood down as principal conductor of the company at the close of the 2024-2025 season.

In 2021, Robert Spano first guest-conducted at WNO. In February 2024, the company hired him as its music director on a three-year contract beginning with the 2025-2026 season.

On January 9, 2026, the company board of directors voted to move its offices and productions out of the Kennedy Center. On January 16, 2026, the company announced plans to continue its 2025-2026 season at George Washington University. On June 12, 2026, the company announced they were suing the Kennedy Center for $17 million, which the opera company estimates it is owed.
