= National Commission on Financial Institution Reform, Recovery and Enforcement =

The National Commission on Financial Institution Reform, Recovery, and Enforcement (NCFIRRE) was established as an independent advisory commission by the Crime Control Act of 1990 and to examine and identify the causes of the savings and loan crisis that led to the passage of the Financial Institutions Reform, Recovery, and Enforcement Act of 1989 (FIRREA). It reviewed state and federal regulation of savings and loan associations and made recommendations to improve the safety and soundness of depository associations, the federal deposit insurance funds, and other federal insurance programs.

It was terminated in 1993 after it released a report called "Origins and Causes of the S&L Debacle: A Blueprint for Reform" on July 27, 1993.
