= Crime Control Act of 1990 =

American Act of Congress

- Other short titles: Child Protection Restoration and Penalties Enhancement Act of 1990; Comprehensive Thrift and Bank Fraud Prosecution and Taxpayer Recovery Act of 1990; Criminal Victims Protection Act of 1990; Federal Debt Collection Procedures Act of 1990; Financial Institutions Anti-Fraud Enforcement Act of 1990; Gun-Free School Zones Act of 1990; Mandatory Detention for Offenders Convicted of Serious Crimes Act; National Child Search Assistance Act of 1990; National Law Enforcement Cooperation Act of 1990; Victims of Child Abuse Act of 1990; Victims' Rights and Restitution Act of 1990
- Long title: An Act to control crime.
- Acronyms (colloquial): CCA, ASCA
- Nicknames: Anabolic Steroids Control Act of 1990
- Enacted by: the 101st United States Congress
- Effective: November 29, 1990

Citations
- Public law: 101-647
- Statutes at Large: 104 Stat. 4789

Codification
- Titles amended: 18 U.S.C.: Crimes and Criminal Procedure
- U.S.C. sections amended: 18 U.S.C. § 1 et seq.

Legislative history
- Introduced in the Senate as S. 3266 by Joseph R. Biden Jr. (D-DE) on October 27, 1990; Passed the Senate on October 27, 1990 (passed voice vote); Passed the House on October 27, 1990 (313-1 Roll call vote 534, via Clerk.House.gov); Signed into law by President George H. W. Bush on November 29, 1990

The Crime Control Act of 1990 was a large Act of Congress that had a considerable impact on the juvenile crime control policies of the 1990s. The bill was passed by the Congress on October 27, 1990, and signed into law by President George H. W. Bush on November 29, 1990.

The Bush administration requested a comprehensive crime bill that would expand the death penalty for federal crimes, reform habeas corpus, limit plea bargaining, revise exclusionary rule, and strengthen penalties for the use of firearms in the commission of a crime. Not all of the sought-after provisions were enacted, but the act made major changes in the areas of child abuse, sexual abuse penalties, victims' rights, and the enforcement of drug laws. The enacted titles were these:

- Anabolic Steroids Control Act of 1990
- Child Protection Restoration and Penalties Enhancement Act of 1990
- Comprehensive Thrift and Bank Fraud Prosecution and Taxpayer Recovery Act of 1990
- Criminal Victims Protection Act of 1990
- Federal Debt Collection Procedures Act of 1990
- Financial Institutions Anti-Fraud Enforcement Act of 1990
- Gun-Free School Zones Act of 1990
- Mandatory Detention for Offenders Convicted of Serious Crimes Act
- National Child Search Assistance Act of 1990
- National Law Enforcement Cooperation Act of 1990
- Victims of Child Abuse Act of 1990
- Victims' Rights and Restitution Act of 1990

== See also ==
- National Commission on Financial Institution Reform, Recovery and Enforcement
