= Macleod v Macleod =

- Court: Judicial Committee of the Privy Council
- Decided: 17 December 2008
- Citation: [2008] UKPC 64

Case history
- Appealed from: High Court of Justice (Isle of Man)

Court membership
- Judges sitting: Lord Scott of Foscote, Lord Walker of Gestingthorpe, Baroness Hale of Richmond, Sir Henry Brooke, Sir Jonathan Parker

Case opinions
- Decision by: Baroness Hale of Richmond

Macleod v Macleod [2008] UKPC 64 was a judgment of the Judicial Committee of the Privy Council in an appeal originating from the Isle of Man. It made clear that postnuptial agreements in the Isle of Man cannot be varied by a court other than for sufficient policy reasons. Although technically only applying to Manx postnuptial agreements, the judgment was treated with authority in the United Kingdom until it was overruled by the Supreme Court of the United Kingdom in Radmacher v. Granatino [2010].

== Facts ==
The husband and wife were both from the United States and married in Florida. The husband was older and far wealthier than the wife. They moved to the Isle of Man in 1995. Before marrying, each party declared their resources and agreed that, in the event of their separation, they would each be entitled to that which they put into the marriage. At the time, the husband's wealth was approximately US$10.3 million. There were additional provisions for monthly allowances and lump payments to be paid by the husband to the wife. Such agreements were perfectly valid and binding in the state of Florida at the time. In 2002, another agreement was struck which made significant alterations to the original agreement, although it made clear that the parties still intended to be bound by the 1995 agreement as amended.

== Proceedings ==
The parties made application for divorce, and proceedings for ancillary relief began in 2005. The wife claimed that the agreements should be disregarded, and claimed for 30% of the husband's wealth at marriage, as well as 50% of any increase to it during the marriage. The husband claimed for the first agreement to be upheld. The Deputy Deemster considered the case at first instance and largely came down on the side of the husband, citing Edgar v Edgar for his decision. A relevant passage from that case reads:

"Men and women of full age education and understanding, acting with competent advice available to them, must be assumed to know and appreciate what they are doing and their actual respective bargaining strengths will in fact depend in every case upon a subjective evaluation of their motives for doing it."

The Deemster did, however, find that the wife was entitled to £2,525,000 to purchase a suitable home for her and the children. Both parties appealed: the wife repeated her claim for the 'full' amount, and the husband repeated his that she should be held to the terms of the original agreement. The Staff of Government Division rejected both parties' appeals. The husband then appealed to the Judicial Committee of the Privy Council. The sole issue was to determine whether the housing needs of the wife should be accommodated by a lump sum (as ordered by the judge) or under the terms of a trust (as argued by the husband under the original agreement).

== Legal background ==
In delivering her judgment on behalf of the whole court, Baroness Hale of Richmond began with the old common law principle that a husband and wife had a duty to live together, and that agreements to live apart were void on grounds of public policy. Over time, courts began to enforce such agreements as the influence of the Ecclesiastical Court waned. By 1929, the courts considered separation agreements to be contracts like any other.

"Agreements for separation are formed, construed and dissolved and to be enforced on precisely the same principles as any respectable commercial agreements, of whose nature indeed they sometimes partake. As in other contracts stipulations will not be enforced which are illegal either as being opposed to positive law or public policy. But this is a common attribute of all contracts, though we may recognize that the subject-matter of separation agreements may bring them more than others into relation with questions of public policy."

In that case, the court held that a spouse cannot surrender their right to claim for ancillary relief in court in some out-of-court settlement, the continuing maintenance of a divorced spouse being a matter of public concern. The Royal Commission on Marriage and Divorce considered the issue between 1951 and 1955. It recommended that a wife be bound by her promise not to apply for relief unless a material change in circumstances takes place. Through the Matrimonial Property and Proceedings Act 1970 and the Matrimonial Causes Act 1973, Parliament essentially upheld the decision in Hyman v Hyman, held that the agreement of a spouse not to apply for relief can amount to consideration to a separation contract, and provided the court with a power of variation. The equivalent Manx statute is the Matrimonial Proceedings Act 2003.

Her Ladyship then turned to Edgar v Edgar, which considered the validity of a separation agreement made once the marriage had already broken down. In that case, Ormrod LJ held,

"It is not necessary in this connection to think in formal legal terms, such as misrepresentation or estoppel; all the circumstances as they affect each of two human beings must be considered in the complex relationship of marriage. So, the circumstances surrounding the making of the agreement are relevant."

These circumstances, listed in part in that judgment, have come to be used in all court-sanctioned compromises to ancillary relief proceedings, including postnuptial agreements. At the time of the Macleod judgment, Radmacher v Granatino was yet to be decided, and so prenuptial agreements were treated as less binding on courts than at the time of writing.

Counsel for the husband relied on the obiter words of Hoffman LJ in Pounds v Pounds:

"The agreement may be held to be binding, but whether it will be can be determined only after litigation and may involve, as in this case, examining the quality of the advice which was given to the party who wishes to resile. It is then understandably a matter for surprise and resentment on the part of the other party that one should be able to repudiate an agreement on account of the inadequacy of one’s own legal advisers, over whom the other party had no control and of whose advice he had no knowledge."

He argued that all separation agreements should be binding, whether they are made before a marriage, after it, or once the marriage has already deteriorated. He argued that the case for recognising prenuptial agreements has strengthened since it has come to be accepted that both parties to a marriage are to be treated equally.

== Judgment ==
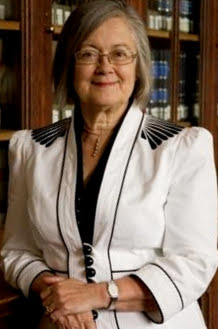
Baroness Hale, who delivered the judgment on behalf of the whole court, would go on to deliver a dissenting judgment on prenuptial agreements in Radmacher v Granatino two years later.

Lady Hale held that equality in marriage does not necessarily make the case for enforceable prenuptial agreements on the basis that it is far fairer for both parties to determine what is fair in the event of their separation than for them to guess at what might be fair in advance. She also found that there was no evidence to suggest that a lack of enforceable prenuptial agreements depresses the rates of marriage in countries compared to those which allow them. She noted that the enforceability of prenuptial agreements was more appropriate for Parliament to make provision for than the courts. She distinguished prenuptial agreements from postnuptial agreements, however. Once the parties are already married, the postnuptial agreement is no longer in exchange for one party's willingness to marry. The only remaining public policy ground on which a postnuptial agreement might have been void was that it would induce the parties no longer to live together, a rule of common law which no longer applies. On this basis, postnuptial agreements can be considered valid subject to the following considerations:

- The parties intended to be bound legally by their arrangement;
- There were no circumstances which would render void any other contract, such as undue influence or fraud;
- There had been no substantial change in circumstances between the making of the postnuptial agreement and the parties coming to court which would make the terms of agreement 'manifestly unjust'; and
- The agreement did not fail to provide for a dependent child.

To conclude, she held,

"We must assume that each party to a properly negotiated agreement is a grown up and able to look after him- or herself. At the same time we must be alive to the risk of unfair exploitation of superior strength. But the mere fact that the agreement is not what a court would have done cannot be enough to have it set aside."

== See also ==
- Postnuptial agreement
- Prenuptial agreement
- Judicial Committee of the Privy Council
- Judiciary of the Isle of Man
