= Postnuptial agreement =

Written agreement executed after a couple gets married

A postnuptial agreement is a written agreement executed after a couple gets married, or have entered a civil union, to settle the couple's affairs and assets in the event of a separation or divorce. It may be "notarized" or acknowledged and may be the subject of the statute of frauds. Like the contents of a prenuptial agreement, provisions vary widely but commonly includes provisions for division of property and spousal support in the event of divorce, death of one of the spouses, or breakup of marriage.

== Purpose ==
A postnuptial agreement is designed to govern the division of a married couple's assets upon divorce. Unlike a prenuptial agreement the contract is entered after the couple has married, and prior to any separation.

== Worldwide ==
=== United Kingdom ===
As with prenuptial agreements, a court has the discretion to reject the terms of a post-nuptial agreements, for example if the court finds that its terms are insufficient to meet the financial needs of partners and children.

=== United States ===
==== History ====
Postnuptial agreements only came to be widely accepted in the United States in the latter half of the 20th century. Before that time, U.S. jurisprudence followed the notion that contracts, such as a postnuptial agreements, could not be valid when executed between a husband and wife. The inability of a husband and wife to contract with one another was due to the concept of marital unity: at the time of marriage, husband and wife become a single entity or person. Since one may not enter into a contract with one's self, a postnuptial agreement would thus be invalid.

Even after U.S. courts began to reject marital unity as a legal theory, postnuptial agreements were rejected as being seen to encourage divorce.

It was only in the 1970s that postnuptial agreements started to gain broad acceptance in the United States. Factors that contributed to this acceptance include the increase in divorce during the 1970s, and the implementation of so-called "no fault" divorces pursuant to which a married couple could get a divorce without the need for an accusation of misconduct against one or both spouses. In the wake of those changes, postnuptial agreements began to find acceptance in American jurisprudence.

==== Legal requirements ====
In the United States, much like prenuptial agreements, although laws vary by state, there are five basic elements that must generally be met for a postnuptial agreement to be enforceable:

1. it must be in writing (oral promises of this kind are always unenforceable);
2. it must be executed voluntarily;
3. it must be done with full and/or fair disclosure at the time of execution;
4. it must not be unconscionable; and
5. it must be executed (signed) by both parties.

Although not required in all states, it is a good idea for both spouses to be independently represented by lawyers when they negotiate and finalize a postnuptial agreement.

Postnuptial agreements typically address one or more of the following concerns:

- Providing for the assignation of marital property at the time of death of one spouse. These agreements may have a surviving spouse waive rights to certain property that they would otherwise have the right to inherit under a will or statutory scheme.
- Agreements made in anticipation of separation. These agreements are entered into to avoid the time and cost of divorce proceedings. The disposition of property, other marital assets, custody, alimony and support and the like are agreed to by the marital partners upon separation and the agreement later, usually, incorporated into the final divorce decree.
- Agreements that seek to affect the spouses' rights in a future divorce. These agreements address the division of the spouses' assets, including property obtained before and during the marriage, and often limit or waive alimony.

Provisions that are included in a postnuptial agreement that relate to child custody or child support are not enforceable, nor are provisions that attempt to regulate routine aspects of the marital relationship.

== See also ==
- Macleod v Macleod
