= Federal Debt Collection Procedures Act of 1990 =

The Federal Debt Collection Procedures Act of 1990 (FDCPA), Title XXXVI of the Crime Control Act of 1990, Pub. L. No. 101-647, 104 Stat. 4789, 4933 (Nov. 29, 1990), is a United States federal law passed in 1990, affecting collection of money owed to the United States government. The FDCPA preempts state remedy laws in most circumstances.

== Subchapters ==
The Act is codified in Chapter 176 of Title 28 of the United States Code, in four subchapters:

- SUBCHAPTER A—DEFINITIONS AND GENERAL PROVISIONS (§§ 3001–3015)
- SUBCHAPTER B—PREJUDGMENT REMEDIES (§§ 3101–3105)
- SUBCHAPTER C—POSTJUDGMENT REMEDIES (§§ 3201–3206)
- SUBCHAPTER D—FRAUDULENT TRANSFERS INVOLVING DEBTS (§§ 3301–3308)

== Information ==
A provision of the Act states that a person or organization indebted to the United States, against whom a judgment lien has been filed, is ineligible to receive a government grant, including disaster loans.

Noncompliance, depending on severity and frequency, may be punished by fine or even incarceration. FDCPA also allows the federal government to reclaim money that was fraudulently transferred.

The Federal Debt Collection Procedures Act of 1990 consists of sections 3601 through 3631 of the Crime Control Act of 1990.
