= Christoph Schaffrath =

German musician and composer (1709–1763)

Christoph Schaffrath (1709 in Hohnstein, Electorate of Saxony – 7 February 1763 in Berlin, Kingdom of Prussia) was a German musician and composer of the late Baroque to Classical transition era.

Christoph Schaffrath (1709-1763) - Duetto in D-Minor for 2 Violas da Gamba
Performed by ViolMedium in February 2019

== Career ==
Schaffrath was born in Hohnstein. He applied to be organist at the Sophienkirche in Dresden, but did not receive this position (Wilhelm Friedemann Bach was favoured for it).

In June 1733, he sought the position of organist at St. Sophia's Church in Dresden; however, Wilhelm Friedemann Bach won the audition (on June 22, 1733). For a time, he served as Kapellmeister to the Lithuanian Prince Paweł Karol Sanguszko (1680–1750) in Zasław, then in the Polish-Lithuanian Commonwealth (today in Ukraine).

He did serve in the court of the Crown Prince Frederick (Frederick the Great) as a harpsichordist in the orchestra. While still only Crown Prince, Frederick began assembling a private orchestra at his Neuruppin residence in 1732: Johann Gottlieb Graun was the first musician to enter his service that year, followed by Franz Benda in 1733, Johann Georg Benda in 1734, Carl Heinrich Graun in 1735, and then Christoph Schaffrath and Johann Gottlieb Janitsch in 1736.

From 1741, however, Schaffrath was strictly the musician to the King's sister, Amalia.

As a composer Schaffrath limited himself to instrumental music including symphonies, keyboard pieces, sonatas and concertos. Schaffrath's music can be considered transitional, including pieces which are stylistically galant (between the Baroque and the Classical). The majority of his works may now be found in the state library in Berlin.

He composed many types of music. He was most notable for overtures, symphonies, harpsichord concerti, quartets, trios, duets for a solo instrument and obbligato harpsichord, and sonatas for harpsichord.

== Recordings ==
- Ouvertüre A-Dur / Flötenkonzert e-Moll / Sinfonie XIII g-Moll / Cembalokonzert Es-Dur / Ouvertüre a-Moll, Händelfestspielorchester Halle cond. Howard Arman, Music Alliance AG, 1995
- Sonates Pour Viole & Autres Instruments, Massimiliano Raschietti: Harpsichord; Guido Balestracci: Viola da Gamba; Martin Zeller: Viola da Gamba, Violoncello; Amandine Beyer: Violin, Zig Zag Territoires, 2005
- Trios & Sonatas, Epoca Barocca, cpo, 2006
- Six Sonatas for Harpsichord Op.2, Borbala Dobozy, Hungaroton, 2008
- Six Sonatas (Duetti), Christoph Anselm Noll, Christoph Lehmann: Harpsichord; Alessandro Piqué: Oboe; Hartwig Groth, Jan Freiheit: Viola da Gamba; Margarete Adorf: Violin, Epoca Barocca, cpo, 2009
- XII Soli per il Cembalo, Marius Bartoccini: Harpsichord, Clavichord, Brilliant Classics, 2026
