= Frac Spread Count =

- Product type: Industry metric / Oilfield activity metric
- Country: United States
- Introduced: 2014
- Website: primaryvision.co

The Frac Spread Count (FSC) is an oilfield activity metric that tracks the number of active hydraulic fracturing ("frac") fleets operating in North America. Published by the energy data firm Primary Vision, the count is used by economists, market analysts, and commodity traders to monitor completion activity in the unconventional oil and gas sector.

In energy market analysis, the Frac Spread Count is different from traditional drilling metrics, such as the Baker Hughes rig count. While rig counts track the initial drilling of wellbores, the Frac Spread Count measures the completion phase of the well lifecycle. Because a well cannot begin production until it has been stimulated through hydraulic fracturing, the metric is used for analyzing near-term changes in oil and gas supply and evaluating changes in drilled but uncompleted well (DUC) inventories.

== History and context ==
The Frac Spread Count was introduced in 2014 during the expansion of the U.S. shale boom. As the industry transitioned toward a short-cycle production model where operators could adjust production volumes relatively quickly in response to price signals, analysts increasingly sought data focused on the completion stage rather than drilling alone.

The metric tracks the deployment of "frac spreads," which are the configurations of high-pressure pumps, blenders, and monitoring units required to execute hydraulic fracturing at a well site. The data is aggregated weekly to provide updates across major North American shale basins, including the Permian Basin, Eagle Ford, and Bakken Formation.

== Industry adoption and citation ==
The metric is used as an energy infrastructure indicator by financial publications, news agencies, and academic researchers tracking domestic production trends.

=== Media and market analysis ===
News organizations, wire services, and financial media reference Primary Vision's dataset when reporting on the operational pace of the U.S. energy sector:

- News Agencies: Reuters, Bloomberg News, and the Associated Press include the metric in their commodity market and economic coverage. Reports use the count to track how factors like capital constraints, supply chain conditions, and geopolitical developments affect domestic crude supply.
- Financial Journalism: Market columns in the Financial Times and The Wall Street Journal cite the count when analyzing corporate reinvestment strategies, capital discipline among shale operators, and private equity spending in the oilfield services sector.
- Trade Press: Industry journals, including The American Oil & Gas Reporter (AOGR) and Oilprice.com, publish the weekly data updates and provide overviews of active oilfield service horsepower trends.

=== Academic and institutional research ===
The dataset is also used in academic literature and economic studies examining energy sector efficiency:

- A 2023 study in IEEE Access used the Frac Spread Count as an independent variable to model supply-chain linkages and macroeconomic trends affecting the semiconductor equipment market.
- Research in Geoforum utilized the data to analyze the geographic logistics and infrastructure requirements of the short-cycle tight oil production model compared to traditional, long-cycle international projects.
- Reports by institutions such as the Asia Pacific Energy Research Centre (APERC) reference the metric when evaluating infrastructure capacity and production trends during energy market transitions.

== See also ==
- Petroleum industry in the United States
- Energy economics
