= Adhesive =

Non-metallic material used to bond various materials together

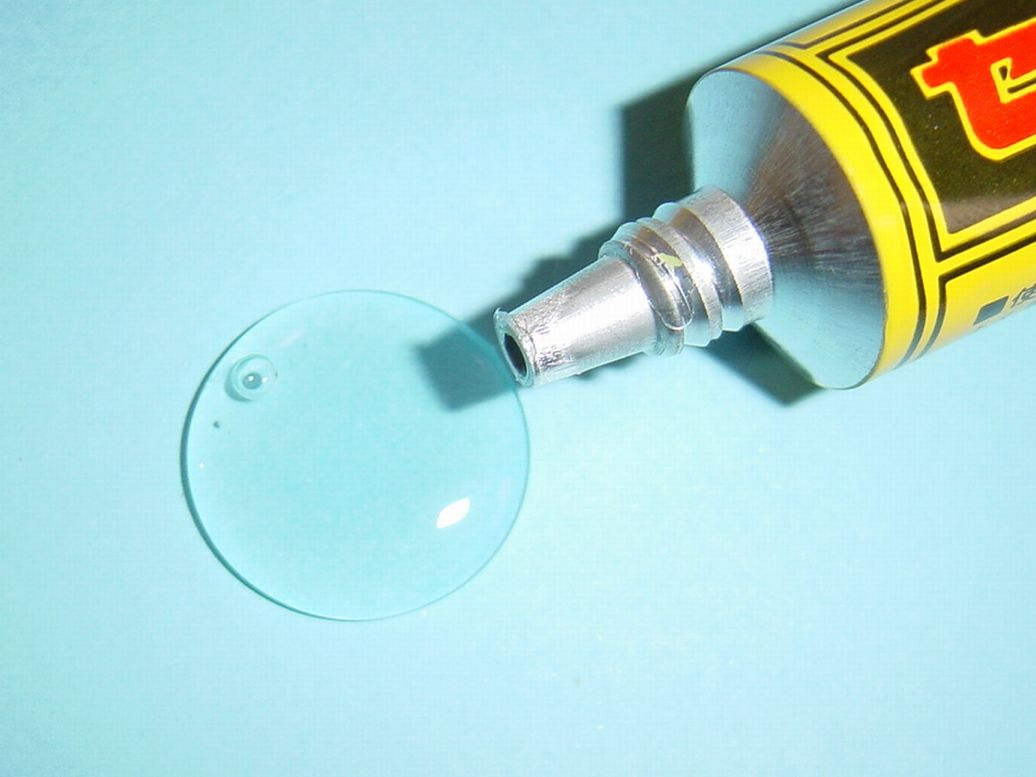
Nitrocellulose adhesive dispensed from a tube

Adhesive, also known as glue, cement, mucilage, or paste, is any non-metallic substance applied to one or both surfaces of two separate items that binds them together and resists their separation.

The use of adhesives offers certain advantages over other binding techniques such as sewing, mechanical fastenings, and welding. These include the ability to bind different materials together, the more efficient distribution of stress across a joint, the cost-effectiveness of an easily mechanized process, and greater flexibility in design. Disadvantages of adhesive use include decreased stability at high temperatures, relative weakness in bonding large objects with a small bonding surface area, and greater difficulty in separating objects during testing. Adhesives are typically organized by the method of adhesion followed by reactive or non-reactive, a term which refers to whether the adhesive chemically reacts in order to harden. Alternatively, they can be organized either by their starting physical phase or whether their raw stock is of natural or synthetic origin.

Adhesives may be found naturally or produced synthetically. The earliest known human use of adhesive-like substances was approximately 200,000 years ago, when Neanderthals produced tar from the dry distillation of birch bark for use in binding stone tools to wooden handles. The first references to adhesives in literature appeared approximately 2000 BC. The Greeks and Romans made great contributions to the development of adhesives. In Europe, glue was not widely used until the period AD 1500–1700. From then until the 1900s increases in adhesive use and discovery were relatively gradual. Only since the 20th century has the development of synthetic adhesives accelerated rapidly, and innovation in the field continues to the present.

== History ==
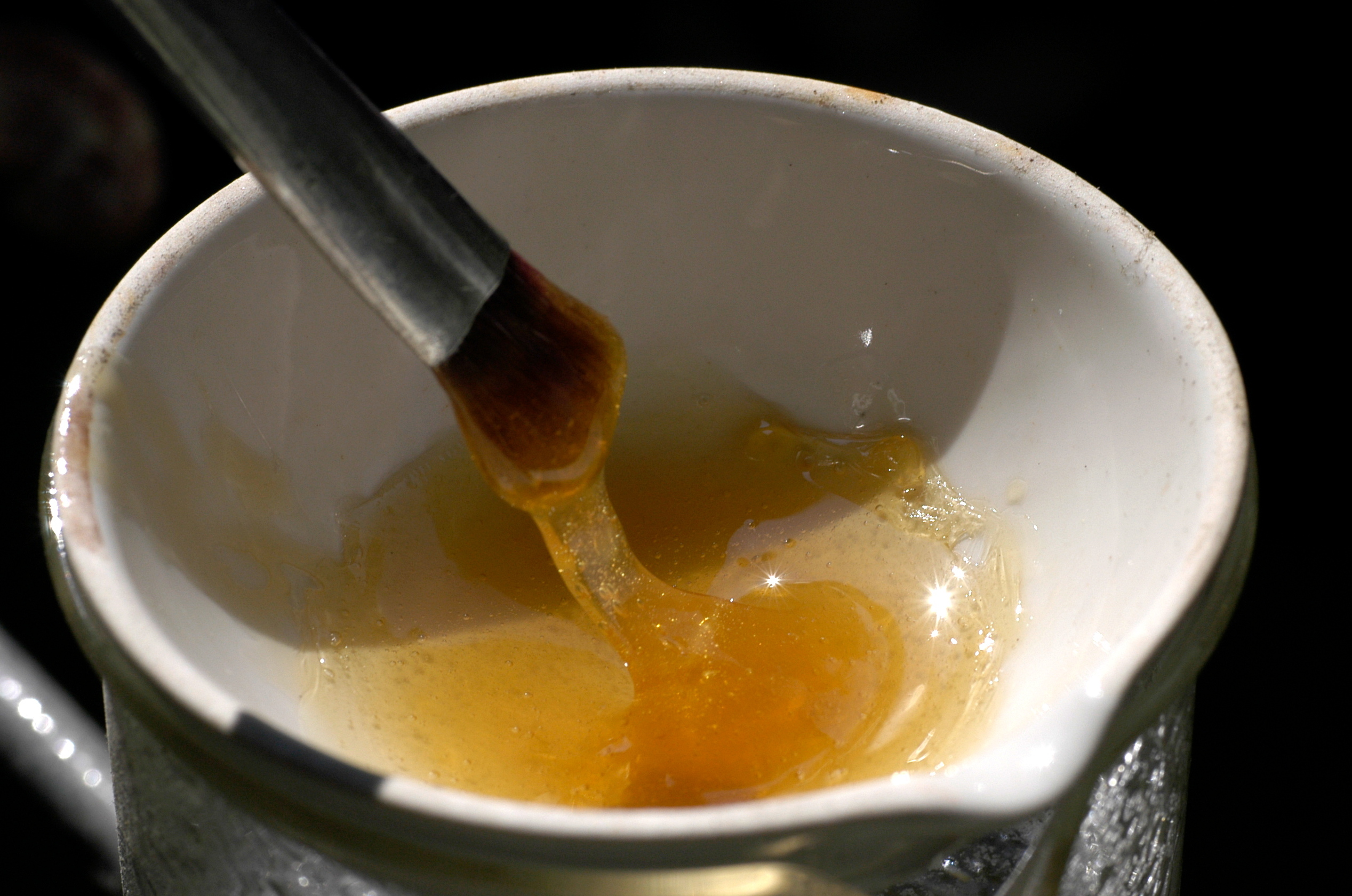
Liquid animal glue

The earliest evidence of human adhesive use was discovered in central Italy when three stone implements were discovered with birch bark tar indications. The tools were dated to about 200,000 before present in the Middle Paleolithic. It is the earliest example of tar-hafted stone tools.

An experimental archeology study published in 2019 demonstrated how birch bark tar can be produced in an easier, more discoverable process. It involves directly burning birch bark under an overhanging rock surface in an open-air environment and collecting the tar that builds up on the rock.

Although sticky enough, plant-based, single-component adhesives can be brittle and vulnerable to environmental conditions. The first use of compound adhesives was discovered in Sibudu, South Africa. Here, 70,000-year-old stone segments that were once inserted in axe hafts were discovered covered with an adhesive composed of plant gum and red ochre (natural iron oxide) as adding ochre to plant gum produces a stronger product and protects the gum from disintegrating under wet conditions. The ability to produce stronger adhesives allowed middle Stone Age humans to attach stone segments to sticks in greater variations, which led to the development of new tools. A study of material from Le Moustier indicates that Middle Paleolithic people, possibly Neanderthals, used glue made from a mixture of ocher and bitumen to make hand grips for cutting and scraping stone tools.

More recent examples of adhesive use by prehistoric humans have been found at the burial sites of ancient tribes. Archaeologists studying the sites found that approximately 6,000 years ago the tribesmen had buried their dead together with food found in broken clay pots repaired with tree resins. Another investigation by archaeologists uncovered the use of bituminous cements to fasten ivory eyeballs to statues in Babylonian temples dating to approximately 4000 BC.

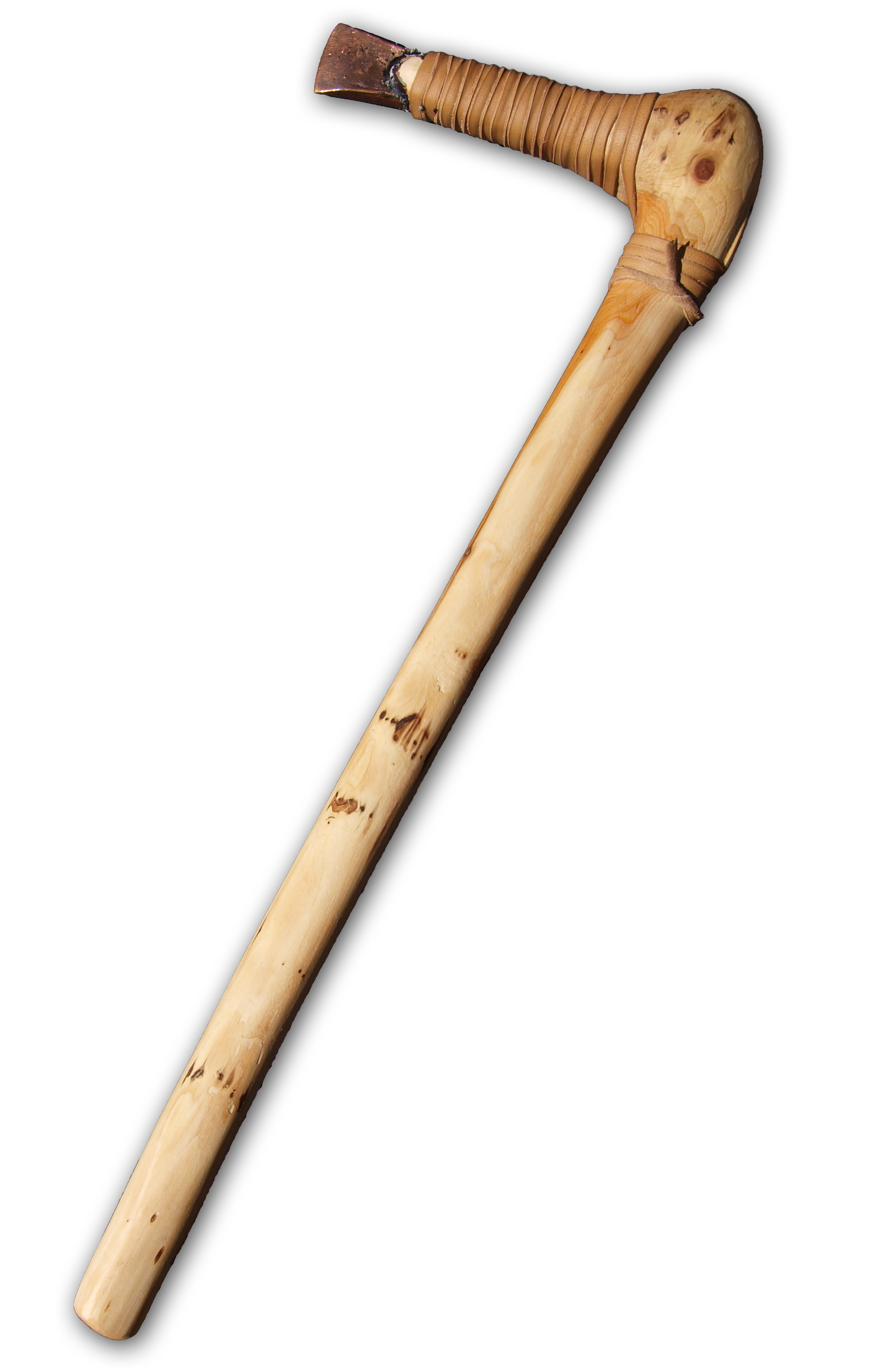
A reconstruction of Ötzi's axe, which used pitch as an adhesive

In 2000, a paper revealed the discovery of a 5,200-year-old man nicknamed the "Tyrolean Iceman" or "Ötzi", who was preserved in a glacier near the Austria-Italy border. Several of his belongings were found with him including two arrows with flint arrowheads and a copper hatchet, each with evidence of organic glue used to connect the stone or metal parts to the wooden shafts. The glue was analyzed as pitch, which requires the heating of tar during its production. The retrieval of this tar requires a transformation of birch bark by means of heat, in a process known as pyrolysis.

The first references to adhesives in literature appeared in approximately 2000 BC. Further historical records of adhesive use are found from the period spanning 1500–1000 BC. Artifacts from this period include paintings depicting wood gluing operations and a casket made of wood and glue in King Tutankhamun's tomb. Other ancient Egyptian artifacts employ animal glue for bonding or lamination. Such lamination of wood for bows and furniture is thought to have extended their life and was accomplished using casein (milk protein)-based glues. The ancient Egyptians also developed starch-based pastes for the bonding of papyrus to clothing and a plaster of Paris-like material made of calcined gypsum.

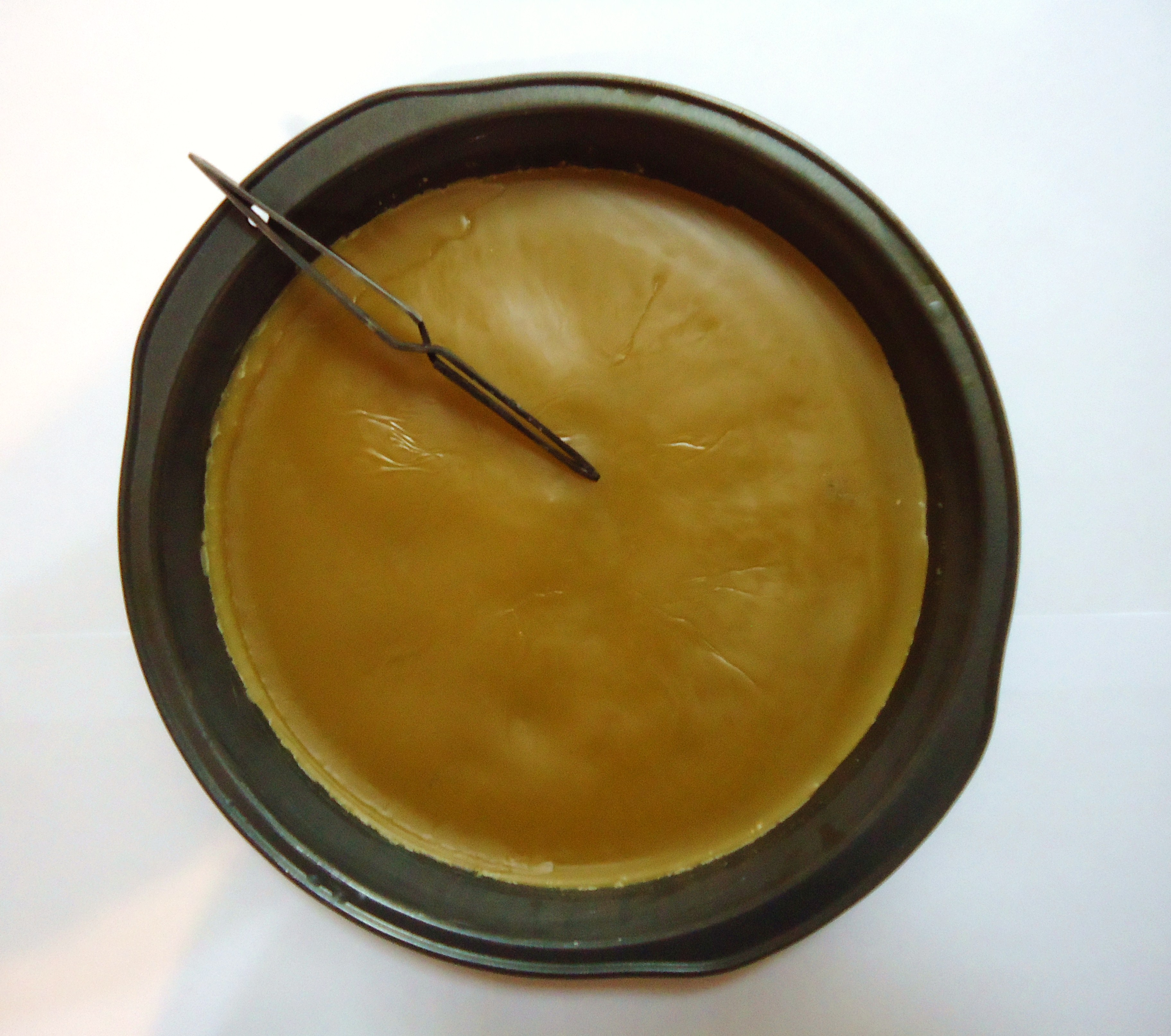
Beeswax

From AD 1 to 500 the Greeks and Romans made great contributions to the development of adhesives. Wood veneering and marquetry were developed, the production of animal and fish glues refined, and other materials utilized. Egg-based pastes were used to bond gold leaves, and incorporated various natural ingredients such as blood, bone, hide, milk, cheese, vegetables, and grains. The Greeks began the use of slaked lime as mortar while the Romans furthered mortar development by mixing lime with volcanic ash and sand. This material, known as pozzolanic cement, was used in the construction of the Roman Colosseum and Pantheon. The Romans were also the first people known to have used tar and beeswax as caulk and sealant between the wooden planks of their boats and ships.

In Central Asia, the rise of the Mongols in approximately AD 1000 can be partially attributed to the good range and power of the bows of Genghis Khan's hordes. These bows were made of a bamboo core, with horn on the belly (facing towards the archer) and sinew on the back, bound together with animal glue.

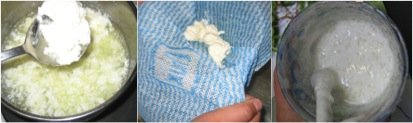
Casein glue preparation

In Europe, glue fell into disuse until the period AD 1500–1700. At this time, world-renowned cabinet and furniture makers such as Thomas Chippendale and Duncan Phyfe began to use adhesives to hold their products together. In 1690, the first commercial glue plant was established in The Netherlands. This plant produced glues from animal hides. In 1750, the first British glue patent was issued for fish glue. The following decades of the next century witnessed the manufacture of casein glues in German and Swiss factories. In 1876, the first U.S. patent (number 183,024) was issued to the Ross brothers for the production of casein glue.

The first U.S. postage stamps used starch-based adhesives when issued in 1847. The first US patent (number 61,991) on dextrin (a starch derivative) adhesive was issued in 1867.

Natural rubber was first used as material for adhesives in 1830, which marked the starting point of the modern adhesive. In 1862, a British patent (number 3288) was issued for the plating of metal with brass by electrodeposition to obtain a stronger bond to rubber. The development of the automobile and the need for rubber shock mounts required stronger and more durable bonds of rubber and metal. This spurred the development of cyclized rubber treated in strong acids. By 1927, this process was used to produce solvent-based thermoplastic rubber cements for metal to rubber bonding.

Natural rubber-based sticky adhesives were first used on a backing by Henry Day (US Patent 3,965) in 1845. Later these kinds of adhesives were used in cloth backed surgical and electric tapes. By 1925, the pressure-sensitive tape industry was born. Today, sticky notes, Scotch Tape, and other tapes are examples of pressure-sensitive adhesives (PSA).

A key step in the development of synthetic plastics was the introduction of a thermoset plastic known as Bakelite phenolic in 1910. Within two years, phenolic resin was applied to plywood as a coating varnish. In the early 1930s, phenolics gained importance as adhesive resins.

The 1920s, 1930s, and 1940s witnessed great advances in the development and production of new plastics and resins due to the First and Second World Wars. These advances greatly improved the development of adhesives by allowing the use of newly developed materials that exhibited a variety of properties. With changing needs and ever evolving technology, the development of new synthetic adhesives continues to the present. However, due to their low cost, natural adhesives are still more commonly used.

== Types ==
Adhesives are typically organized by the method of adhesion. These are then organized into reactive and non-reactive adhesives, which refers to whether the adhesive chemically reacts in order to harden. Alternatively they can be organized by whether the raw stock is of natural or synthetic origin, or by their starting physical phase.

=== By reactiveness ===
==== Non-reactive ====
===== Drying =====
There are two types of adhesives that harden by drying: solvent-based adhesives and polymer dispersion adhesives, also known as emulsion adhesives. Solvent-based adhesives are a mixture of ingredients (typically polymers) dissolved in a solvent. White glue, contact adhesives and rubber cements are members of the drying adhesive family. As the solvent evaporates, the adhesive hardens. Depending on the chemical composition of the adhesive, they will adhere to different materials to greater or lesser degrees.

Polymer dispersion adhesives are milky-white dispersions often based on polyvinyl acetate (PVAc). They are used extensively in the woodworking and packaging industries. They are also used with fabrics and fabric-based components, and in engineered products such as loudspeaker cones.

===== Pressure-sensitive =====
Pressure-sensitive adhesives (PSA) form a bond by the application of light pressure to bind the adhesive with the adherend. They are designed to have a balance between flow and resistance to flow. The bond forms because the adhesive is soft enough to flow (i.e., "wet") to the adherend. The bond has strength because the adhesive is hard enough to resist flow when stress is applied to the bond. Once the adhesive and the adherend are in close proximity, molecular interactions, such as van der Waals forces, become involved in the bond, contributing significantly to its ultimate strength.

PSAs are designed for either permanent or removable applications. Examples of permanent applications include safety labels for power equipment, foil tape for HVAC duct work, automotive interior trim assembly, and sound/vibration damping films. Some high performance permanent PSAs exhibit high adhesion values and can support kilograms of weight per square centimeter of contact area, even at elevated temperatures. Permanent PSAs may initially be removable (for example to recover mislabeled goods) and build adhesion to a permanent bond after several hours or days.

Removable adhesives are designed to form a temporary bond, and ideally can be removed after months or years without leaving residue on the adherend. Removable adhesives are used in applications such as surface protection films, masking tapes, bookmark and note papers, barcode labels, price marking labels, promotional graphics materials, and for skin contact (wound care dressings, EKG electrodes, athletic tape, analgesic and trans-dermal drug patches, etc.). Some removable adhesives are designed to repeatedly stick and unstick. They have low adhesion, and generally cannot support much weight. Pressure-sensitive adhesive is used in Post-it notes.

Pressure-sensitive adhesives are manufactured with either a liquid carrier or in 100% solid form. Articles are made from liquid PSAs by coating the adhesive and drying off the solvent or water carrier. They may be further heated to initiate a cross-linking reaction and increase molecular weight. 100% solid PSAs may be low viscosity polymers that are coated and then reacted with radiation to increase molecular weight and form the adhesive, or they may be high viscosity materials that are heated to reduce viscosity enough to allow coating, and then cooled to their final form. Major raw material for PSA's are acrylate-based polymers.

===== Contact =====
Contact adhesives form high shear-resistance bonds with a rapid cure time. They are often applied in thin layers for use with laminates, such as bonding Formica to countertops, and in footwear, as in attaching outsoles to uppers. Natural rubber and polychloroprene (Neoprene) are commonly used contact adhesives. Both of these elastomers undergo strain crystallization.

Contact adhesives must be applied to both surfaces and allowed some time to dry before the two surfaces are pushed together. Some contact adhesives require as long as 24 hours to dry completely before the surfaces are to be held together. Once the surfaces are pushed together, the bond forms very quickly. Clamping is not required due to the rapid bond formation.

===== Hot =====
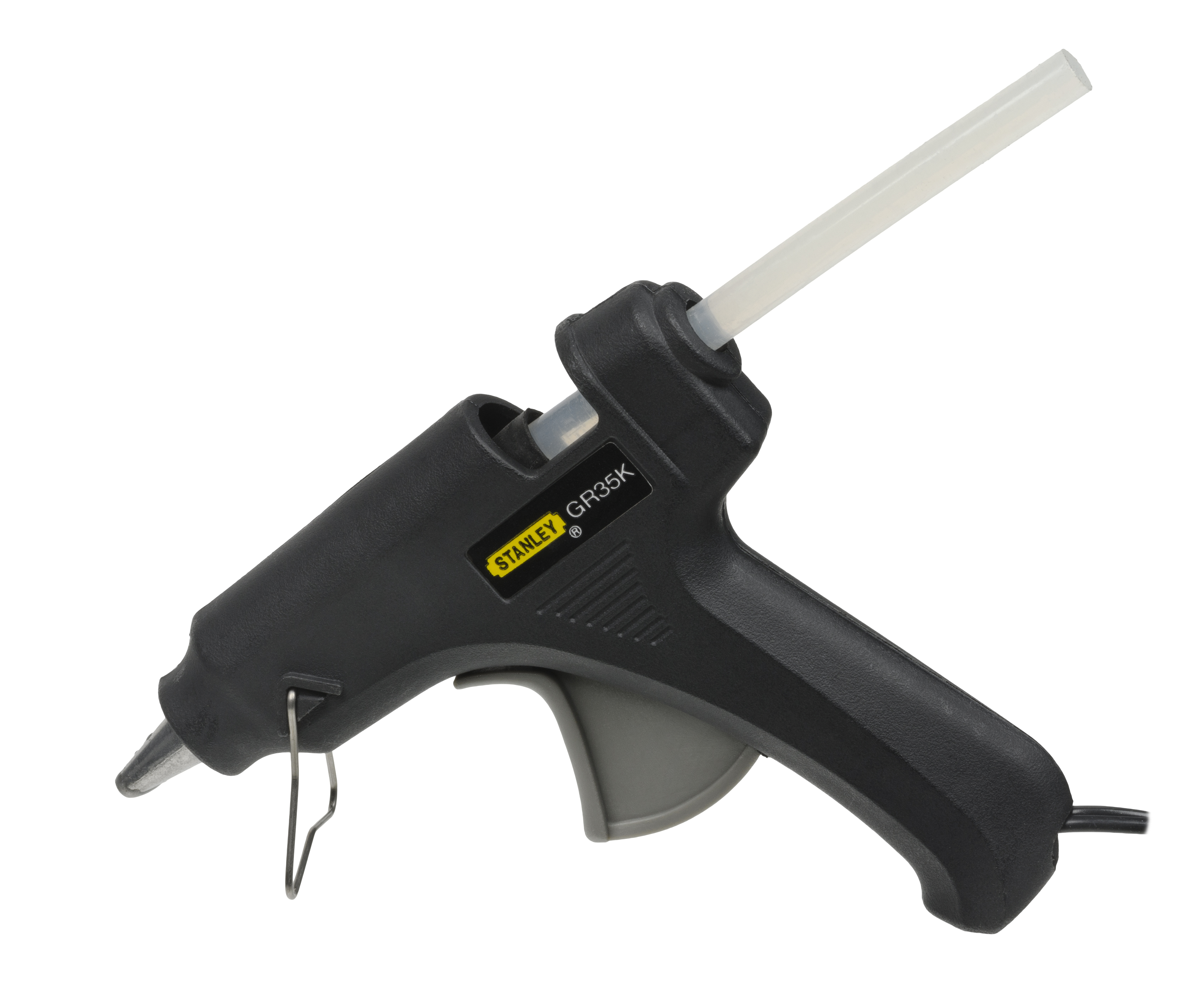
A glue gun, an example of a hot adhesive

Hot adhesives, also known as hot melt adhesives, are thermoplastics applied in molten form (in the 65–180 °C range) which solidify on cooling to form strong bonds between a wide range of materials. Ethylene-vinyl acetate-based hot-melts are particularly popular for crafts because of their ease of use and the wide range of common materials they can join. A glue gun (shown at right) is one method of applying hot adhesives. The glue gun melts the solid adhesive, then allows the liquid to pass through its barrel onto the material, where it solidifies.

Thermoplastic glue may have been invented around 1940 by Procter & Gamble as a solution to the problem that water-based adhesives, commonly used in packaging at that time, failed in humid climates, causing packages to open. However, water-based adhesives are still of strong interest as they typically do not contain volatile solvents.

=== Reactive ===
==== Anaerobic ====
Anaerobic adhesives cure when in contact with metal, in the absence of oxygen. They work well in a close-fitting space, as when used as a thread-locking fluid.

==== Multi-part ====
Multi-component adhesives harden by mixing two or more components which chemically react. This reaction causes polymers to cross-link into acrylates, urethanes, and epoxies.

There are several commercial combinations of multi-component adhesives in use in industry. Some of these combinations are:

- Polyester resin & polyurethane resin
- Polyols & polyurethane resin
- Acrylic polymers & polyurethane resins

The individual components of a multi-component adhesive are not adhesive by nature. The individual components react with each other after being mixed and show full adhesion only on curing. The multi-component resins can be either solvent-based or solvent-less. The solvents present in the adhesives are a medium for the polyester or the polyurethane resin. The solvent is dried during the curing process.

==== Pre-mixed and frozen adhesives ====
Pre-mixed and frozen adhesives (PMFs) are adhesives that are mixed, deaerated, packaged, and frozen. As it is necessary for PMFs to remain frozen before use, once they are frozen at −80 °C they are shipped with dry ice and are required to be stored at or below −40 °C. PMF adhesives eliminate mixing mistakes by the end user and reduce exposure of curing agents that can contain irritants or toxins. PMFs were introduced commercially in the 1960s and are commonly used in aerospace and defense.

==== One-part ====
One-part adhesives harden via a chemical reaction with an external energy source, such as radiation, heat, and moisture.

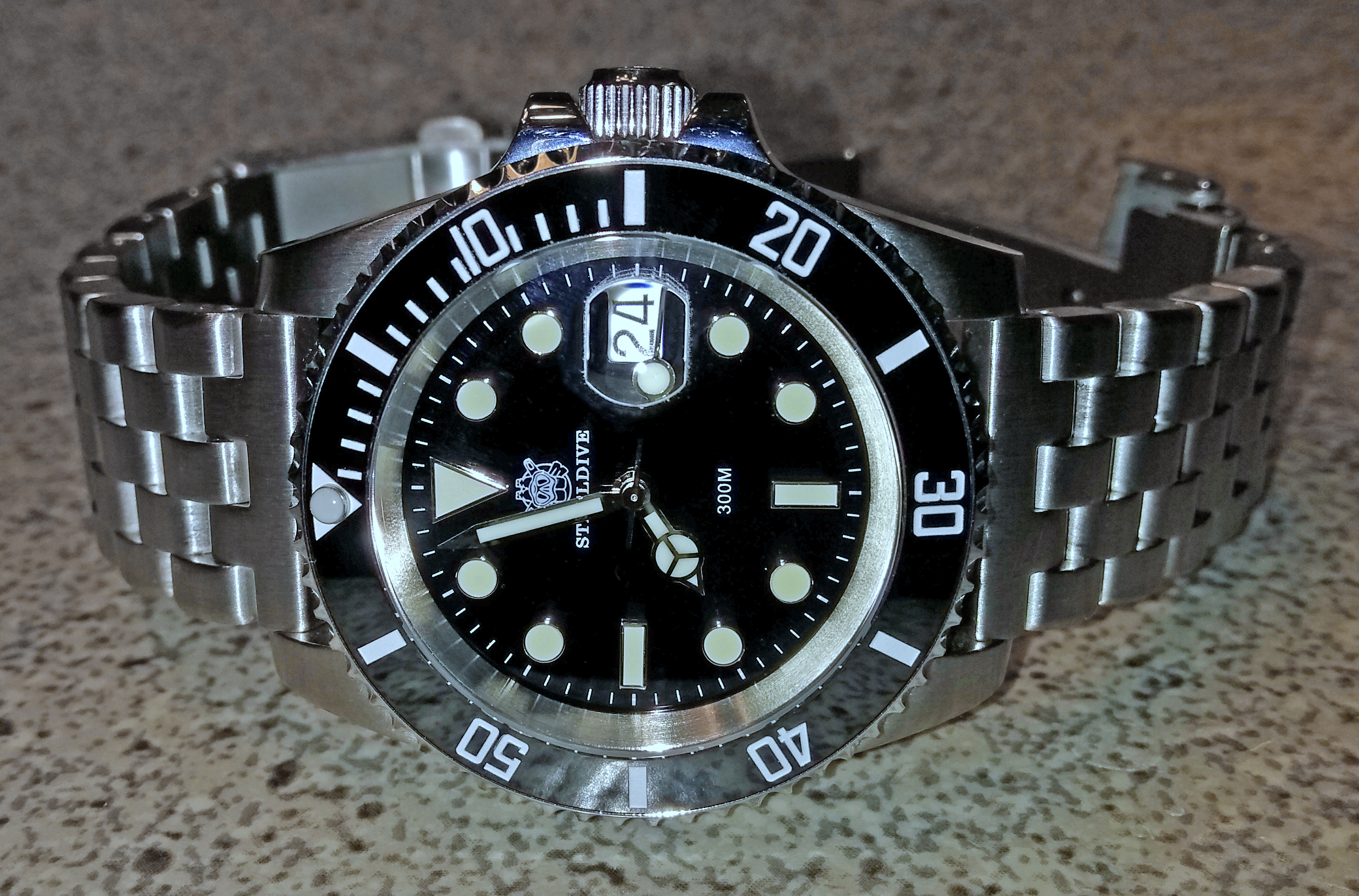
A watch with a date magnifying lens ("cyclops"). The cyclops is attached with transparent UV light curing adhesive to the top of the watch crystal.

Ultraviolet (UV) light curing adhesives, also known as light curing materials (LCM), have become popular within the manufacturing sector due to their rapid curing time and strong bond strength. Light curing adhesives can cure in as little as one second and many formulations can bond dissimilar substrates (materials) and withstand harsh temperatures. These qualities make UV curing adhesives essential to the manufacturing of items in many industrial markets such as electronics, telecommunications, medical, aerospace, glass, and optical. Unlike traditional adhesives, UV light curing adhesives not only bond materials together but they can also be used to seal and coat products. They are generally acrylic-based.

Heat curing adhesives consist of a pre-made mixture of two or more components. When heat is applied the components react and cross-link. This type of adhesive includes thermoset epoxies, urethanes, and polyimides.

Moisture curing adhesives cure when they react with moisture present on the substrate surface or in the air. This type of adhesive includes cyanoacrylates and urethanes.

=== By origin ===
==== Natural ====
Natural adhesives are made from organic sources such as vegetable starch (dextrin), natural resins, or animals (e.g. the milk protein casein and hide-based animal glues). These are often referred to as bioadhesives.

One example is a simple paste made by cooking flour in water. Starch-based adhesives are used in corrugated board and paper sack production, paper tube winding, and wallpaper adhesives. Casein glue is mainly used to adhere glass bottle labels. Animal glues have traditionally been used in bookbinding, wood joining, and many other areas but now are largely replaced by synthetic glues except in specialist applications like the production and repair of stringed instruments. Albumen made from the protein component of blood has been used in the plywood industry. Masonite, a wood hardboard, was originally bonded using natural wood lignin, an organic polymer, though most modern particle boards such as MDF use synthetic thermosetting resins.

==== Synthetic ====
Synthetic adhesives are made out of organic compounds. Many are based on elastomers, thermoplastics, emulsions, and thermosets. Examples of thermosetting adhesives are: epoxy, polyurethane, cyanoacrylate and acrylic polymers. The first commercially produced synthetic adhesive was Karlsons Klister in the 1920s.

== Application ==
Applicators of different adhesives are designed according to the adhesive being used and the size of the area to which the adhesive will be applied. The adhesive is applied to either one or both of the materials being bonded. The pieces are aligned and pressure is added to aid in adhesion and rid the bond of air bubbles.

Common ways of applying an adhesive include brushes, rollers, using films or pellets, spray guns and applicator guns (e.g., caulk gun). All of these can be used manually or automated as part of a machine.

== Mechanisms of adhesion ==
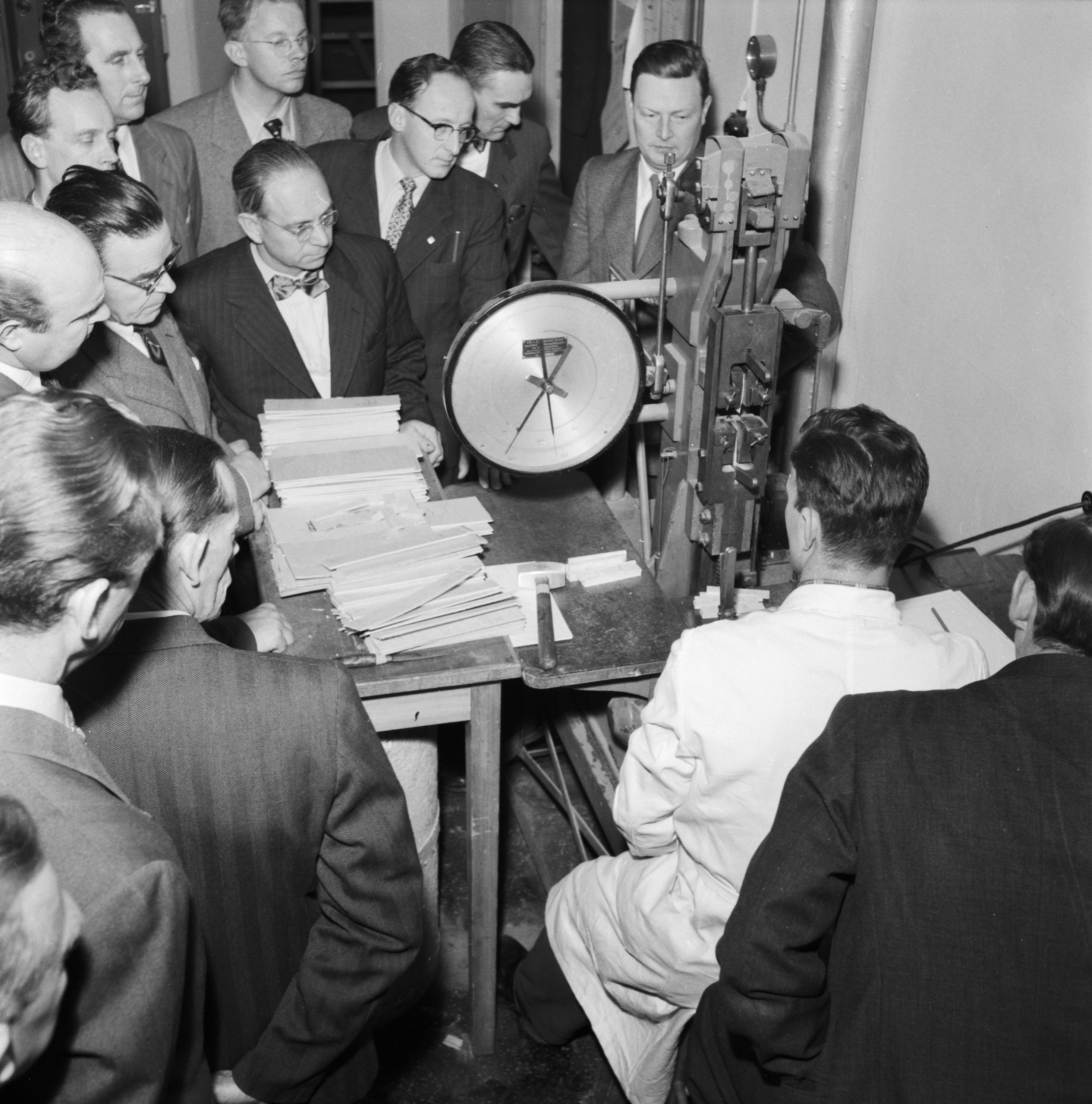
Adhesive testing at Swedish company Casco, using glued wood blocks, in Stockholm 1954.

For an adhesive to be effective it must have three main properties. Firstly, it must be able to wet the base material. Wetting is the ability of a liquid to maintain contact with a solid surface. It must also increase in strength after application, and finally it must be able to transmit load between the two surfaces/substrates being adhered.

Adhesion, the attachment between adhesive and substrate may occur either by mechanical means, in which the adhesive works its way into small pores of the substrate, or by one of several chemical mechanisms. The strength of adhesion depends on many factors, including the means by which it occurs.

In some cases, an actual chemical bond occurs between adhesive and substrate. Thiolated polymers, for example, form chemical bonds with endogenous proteins such as mucus glycoproteins, integrins or keratins via disulfide bridges. Because of their comparatively high adhesive properties, these polymers find numerous biomedical applications. In others, electrostatic forces, as in static electricity, hold the substances together. A third mechanism involves the van der Waals forces that develop between molecules. A fourth means involves the moisture-aided diffusion of the glue into the substrate, followed by hardening.

== Methods to improve adhesion ==
The quality of adhesive bonding depends strongly on the ability of the adhesive to efficiently cover (wet) the substrate area. This happens when the surface energy of the substrate is greater than the surface energy of the adhesive. However, high-strength adhesives have high surface energy. Thus, they bond poorly to low-surface-energy polymers or other materials. To solve this problem, surface treatment can be used to increase the surface energy as a preparation step before adhesive bonding. Importantly, surface preparation provides a reproducible surface allowing consistent bonding results. The commonly used surface activation techniques include plasma activation, flame treatment and wet chemistry priming.

== Electrically-debondable adhesive (EDA) ==
Adhesives can be designed so that they debond when an electric current or electric field is applied, thereby eliminating part damage, or the need for heating.

== Health effects ==
Depending on the type of adhesive, different health risks present themselves. Exposure can occur by direct contact or inhalation of fumes and is potentially life-threatening.

== Failure ==
Failure of the adhesive joint can occur in different locations

There are several factors that could contribute to the failure of two adhered surfaces. Sunlight and heat may weaken the adhesive. Solvents can deteriorate or dissolve adhesive. Physical stresses may also cause the separation of surfaces. When subjected to loading, debonding may occur at different locations in the adhesive joint. The major fracture types are the following:

=== Cohesive fracture ===
Cohesive fracture is obtained if a crack propagates in the bulk polymer which constitutes the adhesive. In this case the surfaces of both adherends after debonding will be covered by fractured adhesive. The crack may propagate in the center of the layer or near an interface. For this last case, the cohesive fracture can be said to be "cohesive near the interface".

=== Adhesive fracture ===
Adhesive fracture (sometimes referred to as interfacial fracture) is when debonding occurs between the adhesive and the adherend. In most cases, the occurrence of adhesive fracture for a given adhesive goes along with smaller fracture toughness.

=== Other types of fracture ===
Other types of fracture include:

- The mixed type, which occurs if the crack propagates at some spots in a cohesive and in others in an interfacial manner. Mixed fracture surfaces can be characterised by a certain percentage of adhesive and cohesive areas.
- The alternating crack path type which occurs if the cracks jump from one interface to the other. This type of fracture appears in the presence of tensile pre-stresses in the adhesive layer.
- Fracture can also occur in the adherend if the adhesive is tougher than the adherend. In this case, the adhesive remains intact and is still bonded to one substrate and remnants of the other. For example, when one removes a price label, the adhesive usually remains on the label and the surface. This is cohesive failure. If, however, a layer of paper remains stuck to the surface, the adhesive has not failed.

== Design of adhesive joints ==
Modes of failure

As a general design rule, the material properties of the object need to be greater than the forces anticipated during its use. (i.e. geometry, loads, etc.). The engineering work will consist of having a good model to evaluate the function. For most adhesive joints, this can be achieved using fracture mechanics. Concepts such as the stress concentration factor and the strain energy release rate can be used to predict failure. In such models, the behavior of the adhesive layer itself is neglected and only the adherents are considered.

Failure will also very much depend on the opening mode of the joint.

- Mode I is an opening or tensile mode where the loadings are normal to the crack.
- Mode II is a sliding or in-plane shear mode where the crack surfaces slide over one another in direction perpendicular to the leading edge of the crack. This is typically the mode for which the adhesive exhibits the highest resistance to fracture.
- Mode III is a tearing or antiplane shear mode.

As the loads are usually fixed, an acceptable design will result from combination of a material selection procedure and geometry modifications, if possible. In adhesively bonded structures, the global geometry and loads are fixed by structural considerations and the design procedure focuses on the material properties of the adhesive and on local changes on the geometry.

Increasing the joint resistance is usually obtained by designing its geometry so that:

- The bonded zone is large
- It is mainly loaded in mode II
- Stable crack propagation will follow the appearance of a local failure.

== Shelf life ==
Some glues and adhesives have a limited shelf life. Shelf life is dependent on multiple factors, the foremost of which being temperature. Adhesives may lose their effectiveness at high temperatures, as well as become increasingly stiff. Other factors affecting shelf life include exposure to oxygen or water vapor.

== See also ==
- Adhesive surface forces – Molecular property
- Impact glue
- Adhesive tape – Strip of material backed with adhesive
- Blu-Tack – Pressure-sensitive adhesive putty
- Glue sniffing – Chemical, often household, breathed in to cause intoxication
- Glue stick – Solid adhesive in a twist or push-up tube
- Mucilage – Thick, gluey substance produced by nearly all plants and some microorganisms
- Sealant – Substance used to block the passage of fluids through openings
- Wood glue – Adhesive used to bond wood and wood-based materials
- Accelerated testing of adhesives

== Bibliography ==
- Ebnesajjad, Sina (2010). "History of Adhesives". Handbook of Adhesives and Surface Preparation: Technology, Applications and Manufacturing. Amsterdam: Elsevier. ISBN 978-1-4377-4461-3.
- Kinloch, Anthony J. (1987). Adhesion and Adhesives: Science and Technology. London: Chapman and Hall. ISBN 041227440X
- Lau, John H.; Wong, C. P.; Lee, Ning-Cheng; Lee, S. W. Ricky (2002). Electronics Manufacturing: With Lead-free, Halogen-free, and Conductive-adhesive Materials. McGraw-Hill Professional. ISBN 978-0-07-138624-1.
- Mittal, K.L.; Pizzi, A. (2003). Handbook of Adhesive Technology. New York: Marcel Dekker. ISBN 0-8247-0986-1.
- Todd, Robert H.; Allen, Dell K.; Alting, Leo (1994). Manufacturing Processes Reference Guide. Industrial Press Inc. ISBN 0-8311-3049-0.
