= John H. Lau =

Engineer and academic

- Occupations: Engineer and academic

Academic background
- Education: B.S., Civil Engineering; M.S., Structural Mechanics; M.S., Engineering Physics; M.S., Management Science; Ph.D., Theoretical and Applied Mechanics
- Alma mater: National Taiwan University; University of British Columbia; University of Wisconsin; University of Illinois; Fairleigh Dickinson University

John H. Lau (Chinese: 劉漢誠) is an engineer and academic. He is a senior special project assistant at the Unimicron Technology Corporation.

Lau's research interests have included advanced semiconductor packaging, flip chip, chiplet design, heterogeneous integration, co-packaged optics, glass packaging, hybrid bonding, fan-out wafer/panel-level packaging, and 2D, 2.1D, 2.3D, 2.5D, 3D, 3.3D, and 3.5D integrated circuit technologies. He is a fellow of the Institute of Electrical and Electronics Engineers (IEEE) and the American Society of Mechanical Engineers (ASME). He has received the Worcester Reed Warner Medal and the Avram Bar-Cohen Medal from ASME. he is also the recipient of IEEE's Rao Tummala Electronics Packaging Award and the Meritorious Achievement Award in Continuing Education.

== Education ==
Lau was born and raised in Macau. He earned a B.S. in Civil Engineering from National Taiwan University in 1970. He received an M.S. in Structural Mechanics from the University of British Columbia in 1973 and an M.S. in Engineering Physics from the University of Wisconsin-Madison in 1974. Later, he completed his Ph.D. in Theoretical and Applied Mechanics from the University of Illinois in 1977. He obtained an M.S. in Management Science from Fairleigh Dickinson University in 1981.

== Career ==
Lau began his professional career as a research engineer at Exxon Production and Research Company between 1977 and 1978. He worked as a lead engineer at Ebasco from 1978 to 1980 and at Bechtel Power Corporation from 1981 to 1982. In 1984, he moved to Hewlett Packard Labs, where he was a senior MTS/individual contributor till 1995. Subsequently, he founded Express Packaging Systems and served as its president until 2000. He was employed as a senior interconnection specialist at Agilent Technologies from 2000 to 2006. He was a director of the System Packaging Lab at the Institute of Microelectronics between 2006 and 2009. In 2014, he became a senior technical advisor at ASM Pacific Technology, where he worked for five years. He also worked as a specialist at the Industrial Technology Research Institute. He was a chief technology officer at Unimicron Technology Corporation from 2019 to 2021 and has since then been a senior special project assistant there.

Lau was the editor-in-chief of Circuit World from 1998 to 2000, and has been the general chair of the IEEE/EPS ECTC and IEMT. He was named a distinguished lecturer by ASME. He has also been a distinguished lecturer for IEEE/EPS since 1998.

== Research and work ==
Lau's research has focused on advanced electronic packaging, heterogeneous integration, and reliability engineering for high-performance semiconductor systems. He has studied areas including flip-chip technology, three-dimensional integrated circuit (3D ICs), system-in-package (SiP), and structured reliability engineering framework. He has also studied heterogeneous integration packaging and wafer-level and panel-level packaging, focusing on mold-compound flow behavior, warpage control, and process-failure challenges. Moreover, he has conducted research on thermal fatigue life prediction and solder joint reliability modeling.

Lau's studies have examined thermal analysis and heat-transfer characteristics of TSV-based 3D integrated circuits, the industrial readiness and commercial deployment of wafer-to-wafer hybrid bonding, and co-packaged optics for high-bandwidth energy-efficient communication. His work has also focused on heterogeneous integration (HI) and fan-out packaging in relation to high-performance computing and artificial intelligence applications.

== Awards and honors ==
- 2000 – Meritorious Achievement Award in Continuing Education, IEEE
- 2013 – Rao Tummala Electronics Packaging Award, IEEE
- 2015 – Worcester Reed Warner Medal, ASME
- 2024 – Avram Bar-Cohen Medal, ASME
- 2025 – C. P. Wong Global Electronic Packaging Award, International Conference on Electronic Packaging Technology
- 2025 – Lifetime Achievement Award Recipient, International Microelectronics Assembly and Packaging Society (IMAPS)
- Fellow – IMAPS
- Fellow – IEEE
- Fellow – ASME
