= ESND =

ESND may refer to:

- the ICAO code of Sveg Airport, in Sveg, Sweden.
- the NASDAQ symbol of Essendant Inc.

== See also ==
- eSND, the Electronic Scottish National Dictionary
