= CPO =

CPO may refer to:

== Occupations ==
- Certified Professional Organizer
- Certified Protection Officer, a professional certification for security officers from the International Foundation for Protection Officers
- Chief people officer, a corporate official in charge of human resources
- Chief Performance Officer of the United States
- Chief petty officer, a naval military rank
- Chief privacy officer, an executive responsible for managing issues of privacy laws and policies
- Chief process officer, an executive responsible for defining processes rules and guidelines for an organization to follow
- Chief procurement officer, an executive responsible for supply management
- Chief product officer, or chief production officer, an executive responsible for product/production management and development
- Close Protection Operative/Officer (Bodyguard)
- Certified Prosthetists Orthotists, professionals working as a Prosthetist and Orthotist
- City Police Officer, the city police chief in Pakistan, previously referred to as the Superintendent of Police
- Civil Police Officer, a designation held by a police constable assigned to a local police unit in Kerala, India

== Orchestras ==
- Calgary Philharmonic Orchestra, in Calgary, Alberta, Canada
- Cape Town Philharmonic Orchestra, in Cape Town, South Africa
- China Philharmonic Orchestra, in Beijing, China
- Cleveland Philharmonic Orchestra, in Cleveland, Ohio

== Other ==
- Certified Pre-Owned, a qualification for a used vehicle
- Desierto de Atacama Airport (IATA airport code), Copiapó, Chile
- Charge Point Operator installs and maintains charge stations
- Chelsea Pitch Owners, owners of a football ground in London
- Chloride peroxidase, an enzyme
- Classic Produktion Osnabrück, a German classical music record label
- Code of Openness, or Code of PLM Openness, initiative of ProSTEP iViP Association for openness in the internet of things
- Commodity pool operator, a person of business that pools together investments for trading in commodity futures or commodity options
- Community post office, a type of post office in the United States Postal Service
- Complete partial order, a term used in mathematical order theory
- Compulsory purchase order, a legal function in the UK and Ireland whereby the government can appropriate real property
- Co-packaged optics, a design process of integrating optical transceiver components into PIC
- CPO (group), a 1990s rap duo from California
- CPO Commerce, Inc., an American online retail company
- Crude palm oil, unprocessed palm oil
- Crystallographic preferred orientation, see Texture (crystalline), the preferred orientation of crystal axes as a result of deformation

== See also ==
- Central Post Office (disambiguation), the main post office located in every city of United Arab Emirates
- C-3PO, a character from the Star Wars franchise
