= Ichia Technologies =

Ichia Technologies Inc is a Taiwanese technology manufacturing company specializing in printed circuit boards (PCBs).

== History ==
In 2014 Ichia primarily produced keypads for cell phones as well as other printed circuit board products. At the time the company was based in Linkou District, New Taipei City. Their largest client was BlackBerry with other significant clients including Nokia, Alcatel-Lucent and Sony. Ichia produced the distinctive QWERTY keypads used on BlackBerry phones.

In 2018 an Ichia plant in Jiangsu, China was accused of discharging wastewater contaminated with copper into a local river. The factory was part of Xiaomi's supply chain and the accusation was one of a number of envirmental complaints made against factories in Xiaomi's supply chain. Later in 2018 Ichia was fined for improperly disposing of industrial wastewater at a Suzhou, China factory following a full shutdown of the factory by local authorities. The disruption at the factory resulted in Ichia's revenue falling 10% temporarily.

In 2023 70% of Ichia's revenue came from automobile components.

Ichia has received orders from the makers of humanoid robots.

In 2025 the company struck a new relationship with Nintendo as part of an effort to diversify beyond automobile components.

In 2025 Ichia opened a new plant in Malaysia with a focus on producing PCBs for drones and other robots. This includes specialized flexible circuit modules.

== See also ==
- Unimicron
