= IEEE Access =

Scientific journal

- Discipline: Electrical engineering, electronics, computer technology
- Language: English
- Edited by: Derek Abbott

Publication details
- History: 2013–present
- Publisher: Institute of Electrical and Electronics Engineers
- Frequency: Continuous
- Impact factor: 4.2 (2025)

Standard abbreviations
- ISO 4: IEEE Access

Indexing
- ISSN: 2169-3536
- OCLC no.: 820007312

Links
- Journal homepage; Online access; Online archive

IEEE Access is a peer-reviewed open-access scientific journal published by the Institute of Electrical and Electronics Engineers (IEEE). It was established in 2013 and covers all IEEE fields of interest. The founding editor-in-chief was Michael Pecht (University of Maryland) and the current editor-in-chief is Derek Abbott ( University of Adelaide). The journal won a PROSE Award in 2015 for the best new journal in science, technology, engineering, and mathematics.

== Special sections ==
The journal hosts special sections that highlight a specific topic of general IEEE interest. Associate editors propose a concentration area that emphasizes applications-oriented and interdisciplinary topics. Together with the editorial staff a "Call for Papers" is then sent to academic and industrial researchers soliciting the submissions of manuscripts that identify and discuss technical challenges and recent results on the topic of that section.

== Abstracting and indexing ==
The journal is abstracted and indexed in:

- Current Contents/Engineering, Computing & Technology
- EBSCO databases
- Ei Compendex
- Inspec
- Science Citation Index Expanded
- Scopus
