= IEEE Rao R. Tummala Electronics Packaging Award =

Annual award for contributions to electronic component manufacturing

The IEEE Rao R. Tummala Electronics Packaging Award, formerly called the IEEE Electronics Packaging Award and the IEEE Components, Packaging, and Manufacturing Technologies Award, is a Technical Field Award established by the IEEE Board of Directors in 2002. It is awarded for meritorious contribution to the advancement of components, electronic packaging or manufacturing technologies.

The award may be presented to an individual or a team of up to three recipients.

Recipients of this award receive a bronze medal, certificate and an honorarium.

== Recipients ==
Recipients of the award for each year include:

- 2027: Ravi Mahajan
- 2026: Shi-Wei Ricky Lee
- 2025: Jie Xue
- 2024: Madhavan Swaminathan
- 2023: GuoQi (Kouchi) Zhang
- 2022: Douglas C.H. Yu
- 2021: Chin C. Lee
- 2020: Mitsumasa Koyanagi and Peter Ramm
- 2019: Ephraim Suhir
- 2018: William Chen
- 2017: Paul S. Ho and King-Ning Tu
- 2016: Michael Pecht
- 2015: Nasser Borozorg-Grayeli
- 2014: Avram Bar-Cohen
- 2013: John H. Lau
- 2012: Mauro Walker
- 2011: Rao R. Tummala
- 2010: Herbert Reichl
- 2009: George G. Harman
- 2008: Karl Puttlitz and Paul A. Totta
- 2007: Dimitry Grabbe
- 2006: C. P. Wong
- 2005: Yutaka Tsukada
- 2004: John W. Balde
