= Accelerated testing of adhesives =

Accelerated testing of adhesives is used to predict long term performance of adhesive exposed to a variety of environmental factors. Adhesives are sometimes used as load bearing and sealing joints, which points great stress on them. In accelerated testing, factors like the temperature, moisture, vibrations, voltage, and UV light are greatly increased over a short period so long term predictions can be made about the effect of the aforementioned factors.

== Adhesive failure prediction ==
Accelerated testing may induce reaction kinetics that is not applicable to the actual service environment of an adhesive, which could cause greater concern than is necessary for certain adhesives. High temperatures are often avoided because it frequently causes new reactions to occur.

== Adhesive stability ==
Adhesives commonly react with oxygen at low temperatures, which leads to a slow break down of polymer chains. The breakdown of polymer chains is often undetectable until the adhesive has reached a critical point where the stability of remainder of the adhesive rapidly degrades. High temperature accelerated testing often cannot be used to estimate stability in oxygen environments since high temperatures often lead to new reaction pathways that would not typically exist at the temperature the adhesives would be used.

Moisture sensitivity accelerated tests involve either increased temperatures or increased surface area of a sample. The surface area of samples is increased by applying adhesives to a single surface rather than placing it between two surfaces and placing the sample in a water bath.

== Chemiluminescence ==
When polymers are oxidized, unstable alkyl radicals are formed which react further with oxygen to form peroxy bonds. The excitation and stabilization of the peroxy radical causes chemiluminescence. The light produced by this reaction is typically low wavelength infrared light. The amount of light emitted is used to determine the oxidation rate of an adhesive.

Chemiluminescence (CL) light intensity can be measured at various isothermal oxidation cycles; however, the temperature need not be raised to high levels. Correlation of light intensity is made to oxidation process parameters such as Oxidation Induction Temperature (OIT). By obtaining measurements at different temperatures, an accelerated oxidation progression correlation can be established. The prediction of oxidation during service life can then be carried out.
