= Unimicron =

Taiwanese circuit board manufacturer

Unimicron Technology Corporation
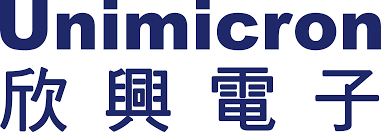
- Type: Public
- Traded as: TWSE: 3037
- Industry: Printed Circuit Boards(PCBs)
- Founded: 1990; 36 years ago
- Headquarters: Taoyuan, Taiwan
- Area served: Worldwide
- Key people: Tseng Tzyy-Jang (Chairman/President/CEO)
- Products: Printed Circuit Boards (PCBs); High Density Interconnection Boards; Flexible PCBs; Rigid-Flex Boards; IC Carriers
- Services: Burn-In Services; IC Testing; Manufacture of Printed Circuit Boards and related services
- Revenue: TWD 64,992.8 Millions (2017)
- Number of employees: 32,644
- Website: www.unimicron.com

Unimicron Technology Corporation (Unimicron; TWSE: 3037) is a printed circuit board (PCB) manufacturer headquartered in Taiwan. The company produces PCBs, high density interconnection (HDI) boards, flexible PCBs, rigid flex PCBs, integrated circuit (IC) carriers, and others. In addition, it provides testing and burn-in services of IC substrates and PCBs. Applications of its products and services include liquid crystal display (LCD) monitors, personal computers (PCs) and peripheral products, notebook computers, network cards, facsimile machines, scanners, mobile phones, personal digital assistants (PDAs), and others. Unimicron has manufacturing sites and/or service centers in Taiwan, China, Germany, and Japan.

== Overview ==
Unimicron, a subsidiary of United Microelectronics Corporation, started in 1990, grew to global rank of 6th in 2006, and became global No. 1 in the PCB industry in 2009 and 2010. Unimicron arrived at a second position in the 2012 global PCB market with a market share of 3.7% and $2.4 billion in revenue.

== See also ==
- Ichia Technologies
