= CPO Commerce =

American online retail company

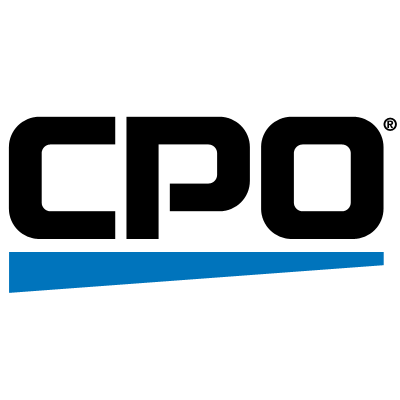
- Industry: Online retail
- Founded: 2004
- Founder: Rob Tolleson
- Headquarters: Pasadena, California
- Products: Power tools, Hand tools, Workwear
- Number of employees: 150-200
- Website: www.cpooutlets.com

CPO Commerce is an American online retail company that operates stores including CPO Outlets, CPO DeWALT, and Tyler Tool.

== Overview ==
Founded in 2004, CPO has shipped over 2 million orders to contractors, woodworkers, and homeowners.

CPO’s online stores are known for their selection of power tools and accessories, as well as their selection of refurbished tools. CPO Commerce also operates specialty tool stores including CPOoutlets.com and Tylertool.com.

== Recognition ==
CPO Commerce has been recognized by Inc. Magazine as one of the fastest growing private companies in America.

CPO was acquired in May 2014 by Essendant, a Chicago-based Fortune 500 B2B company.
