= Certified Professional Organizer =

The Certified Professional Organizer (CPO) designation, awarded by the Board of Certification for Professional Organizers (BCPO), is an experience and exam-based certification for professional organizers who have met specific minimum standards, and proven through examination and client interaction that they possess the requisite body of knowledge and experience.

Prior to sitting for the examination, a CPO candidate must be prepared to verify employment as a professional organizer preceding the exam date. The CPO designation indicates that an individual has the knowledge, experience and skills necessary to teach, transfer or demonstrate organizing skills to facilitate and support a client’s overall personal and/or business goals. The examination presumes that candidates possess and maintain the level of education and experience required for certification as outlined in the eligibility requirements section of the BCPO web site.

Upon successful completion of the BCPO examination, CPOs retain the credential for three years, during which time a total of thirty-six (36) continuing education units (CEUs) must be obtained in order to renew the credential. CPOs adhere to a code of ethics that is enforceable through a stringent ethics complaint procedure.

Recent reality television series such as Hoarders and Hoarding: Buried Alive, and related news stories have brought CPOs into the public eye.

== Mission statement ==
The BCPO online mission statement states

BCPO's mission is to advance the credibility and ethical standards of the professional organizing industry through credentialing.

In recognizing the experienced organizer, BCPO seeks to inspire organizers to provide superior client services and to continue to develop expertise in the transfer of higher-level organizing skills.

== Development ==
In 2005, a job analysis survey was conducted under the supervision of Schroeder Measurement Technologies, Inc., to determine the important knowledge and skill elements required for entry-level practice as a professional organizer.

A Subject Matter Expert (SME) Committee, representing a diversity of practice, experience, geographic regions, and education was appointed to provide content expertise, and charged with determining Job/Task Analysis(JTA) of a professional organizer. From a comprehensive search of the relevant literature, SMT developed an exhaustive list of knowledge and skill elements required for competent practice, and presented it to the JTA Committee for review and approval. An online survey instrument was developed that combined a demographic questionnaire with measurements of the importance of each knowledge and skill element that had been identified.

Statistical analysis of survey results from more than 3,000 professional organizers was used to differentiate important from unimportant elements of professional organizing practice. SMT then translated the JTA-approved list of knowledge and skill elements into an examination content outline. One committee was charged with identifying reference material to support the content outline, and another with writing legally defensible questions that could be associated with specific references.

Finally a Program Definition Team (PDT) set eligibility criteria and related policies. The PDT determined that, based on characteristics of the professional organizing industry, the largest component of eligibility criteria would be interaction with clients.

== Future plans ==
According to the BCPO web site, the organization's intention is that the CPO credential eventually be recognized by ANSI or a similar authority.
