= Michael G. Pecht =

American mechanical engineer (born 1952)

Michael Gerard Pecht (born 1952) is an American mechanical engineer known for his works in the reliability of electronic packaging including the physics-of-failure approach. He leads the Center for Advanced Life Cycle Engineering (CALCE) at the University of Maryland, College Park.

== Education and career ==
Pecht studied at the University of Wisconsin–Madison, where he received his BS in physics in 1978, MS in electronic engineering in 1979, and PhD in engineering mechanics in 1982. His doctoral thesis was on the humidity-stress-strain interactions in polymers, which was supervised by Millard W. Johnson, Jr. He joined the University of Maryland, College Park in 1983 as a faculty member in the Department of Mechanical Engineering. Since 1985, he is the director of CALCE at the University of Maryland, College Park.

== Honors and awards ==
Pecht became an IEEE fellow in 1992, and an ASME fellow in 1995. In 2008, he received the IEEE Reliability Society’s Lifetime Achievement Award. In 2016, Pecht received the IEEE Rao R. Tummala Electronics Packaging Award.

== Books ==
- Pecht, Michael (1994). Integrated circuit, hybrid, and multichip module package design guidelines: a focus on reliability. New York: Wiley. ISBN 978-0-471-59446-8.
- Pecht, Judy; Pecht, Michael (1995). Long-term non-operating reliability of electronic products. Boca Raton, Fla.: CRC Press. ISBN 978-0-8493-9621-2.
- Pecht, Michael (1997). The Korean Electronics Industry. Milton: Taylor & Francis Group. ISBN 978-1-138-43466-0.
- Lee, Chung-Shing; Pecht, Michael (1997). Electronics Industry in Taiwan. Milton: CRC Press LLC. ISBN 978-1-138-43463-9.
- Pecht, Mitel G.; Agarwal, Rakesh; McCluskey, Patrick; Dishongh, Terrance; Javadpour, Sirus; Mahajan, Rahul (1998). Electronic Packaging: Materials and Their Properties. CRC Press. doi:10.1201/9781315214153. ISBN 978-1-315-21415-3.
- Nakayama, Wataru; Boulton, William; Pecht, Michael (1999). The Japanese electronics industry. The electronics industry research series. Boca Raton: Chapman & Hall. ISBN 978-1-58488-026-4.
- Liu, Weifeng; Pecht, Michael (2004). IC component sockets. Hoboken, N.J: Wiley-Interscience. ISBN 978-0-471-46050-3.
- Pecht, Michael G. (2006). China's Electronics Industry: The Definitive Guide for Companies and Policy Makers with Interest in China. William Andrew. ISBN 978-0-8155-1643-9.
- Pecht, Michael G. (2008). Prognostics and Health Management of Electronics. John Wiley & Sons. ISBN 978-0-470-38583-8.
- Ardebili, Haleh; Pecht, Michael G. (2009). Encapsulation Technologies for Electronic Applications. William Andrew. ISBN 978-0-8155-1970-6.
- Kapur, Kailash C.; Pecht, Michael (2014). Reliability engineering. Hoboken, New Jersey: Wiley. ISBN 978-1-118-14067-3.
- Pecht, Michael; Radojcic, Riko; Rao, Gopal K. (2017). Guidebook for Managing Silicon Chip Reliability. CRC Press. ISBN 978-0-13-871961-6.
- Pecht, Michael; Kang, Myeongsu, eds. (2018). Prognostics and health management of electronics: fundamentals, machine learning, and internet of things (2nd ed.). Hoboken, NJ: John Wiley & Sons. ISBN 978-1-119-51535-7.
- Varde, Prabhakar V.; Pecht, Michael (2018). Risk-Based Engineering: An Integrated Approach to Complex Systems—Special Reference to Nuclear Plants. Springer Series in Reliability Engineering. Singapore: Springer. ISBN 978-981-13-0090-5.
- Anand, Davinder; Hazelwood, Dylan; Pecht, Michael; Ainane, Sami; Nguyen, Vincent (2022). Engineering for Social Change Revisited: Engineering Is Not Just Engineering. CALCE EPSC Press. ISBN 978-0-9777295-4-8.
