= Essendant =

American office supply distributor

Essendant Inc.
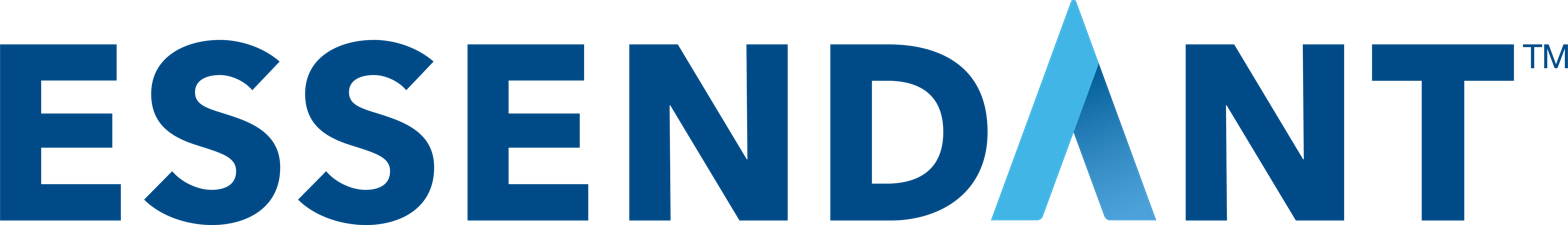
- Type: Subsidiary
- Traded as: Nasdaq: ESND
- Industry: Wholesale Distribution
- Founded: 1922; 104 years ago
- Headquarters: Lincolnshire, Illinois, United States
- Key people: Dave Boone (CEO); Tom Engstrom (SVP); Andy Kiss (SVP of Information Technology); Renee Starr (SVP); Marcela Sztainberg (SVP of Human Relations); Ryon Wharton (SVP); Harry Dochelli (Advisor)
- Products: Business products, office supplies, electronics, furniture, industrial, janitorial, automotive
- Revenue: ▲$5.369 billion (2016)
- Owner: Sycamore Partners
- Number of employees: 6,400 (2017)
- Website: www.essendant.com

Essendant Inc., formerly known as United Stationers, is a national wholesale distributor of office supplies, with consolidated net sales of $5.3 billion. Essendant serves 30,000 reseller customers and stocks over 160,000 items, including traditional office products, office furniture, janitorial and break room supplies, industrial supplies, and technology products. Essendant is headquartered in Lincolnshire, Illinois and also has operations in Dubai, United Arab Emirates (UAE).

== Distribution ==
Essendant's network of 20+ distribution centers allows the company to ship most products overnight to more than 90% of the U.S. and next day delivery to major cities in Canada.

Essendant services and distributes 2,000 brands and 80,000 SKUs across all major channels to their customer base of 30,000 resellers.

== History ==
Essendant was incorporated in 1922 under the name Utility Supply Company in Chicago by partners Harry Hecktman and Morris Wolf. During the early 1930s, the company published its first office products catalog. The concept was such a success that the business was further expanded with the opening of its first retail store in 1937. In the early 1950s, in addition to its catalog and retail operation, management recognized growing opportunities in the office products wholesale business. In 1970, the company opened its first distribution center. As time passed, the company found it difficult to compete as both a retailer and wholesaler. So, in 1978, the retail operations were sold and the company began to operate exclusively as an office products wholesaler.

Essendant incorporated and went public in 1981 as United Stationers Inc. (USTR) on the NASDAQ. In 1984, the company established MicroUnited to capitalize on the growth in the computer supplies sector. The company's MicroUnited division focused on the distribution of peripherals and supplies to computer products resellers.

In June 2002, the company announced that, as part of its succession plan, Richard W. Gochnauer, would become the company's chief operating officer and a member of the board of directors upon his start at the company in July.

In September 2008, the company pioneered the use of data analytics to illustrate the Value of Wholesale to distribution (aka VOW Program).

In December 2010, the company announced that P. Cody Phipps, the company's chief operating officer, would become president and CEO when Richard W. Gochnauer, CEO, retired at the annual shareholders’ meeting in May 2011.

In April 2015, the company announced the departure of P. Cody Phipps, the company's chief executive officer, and Director Robert Blaine Aiken Jr. would take over as interim CEO. In early 2015, the company re-branded from United Stationers to Essendant. The new company name became effective in June 2015. The company's symbol on the NASDAQ Global Select Market changed from USTR to ESND.

In July 2015, Essendant announced that its board of directors appointed Robert B. Aiken Jr., president and CEO effective immediately. Aiken, who had been serving as interim president and CEO since May 2015, would continue as an Essendant board member.

On October 25, 2017, the board of directors elected Richard D. Phillips president and chief executive officer, effective immediately. Mr. Phillips, who had been serving as interim president and CEO since June 2017, was also elected to Essendant's board of directors and the board's executive committee. January 31, 2019, the board announced that Harry Dochelli had been named president.

In May 2024, Harry Dochelli announced his retirement and Dave Boone, former CEO of Staples Canada, was named interim CEO in his stead. Dochelli will remain on as an advisor until December 2024.

In June 2024, Essendant launched Connected Commerce, an ecommerce, fulfillment and third-party logistics platform. Connected Commerce services are intended to serve companies in business-to-business (B2B), business-to-consumer (B2C), and business-to-business-to-consumer (B2B2C).

In September of 2025, it was announced that the majority of the fulfillment centers were closing their doors, leaving just 5 operating facilities.

== Mergers and acquisitions ==
As competition in the late 1980s intensified within the office products industry, consolidation at all levels of the industry became commonplace. In June 1992, the company acquired Stationers Distributing Company, a $425 million office products wholesaler in Fort Worth, Texas. This transaction made the company a $1.5 billion wholesale distributor.

In March 1995, the company acquired Associated Stationers, a $475 million general line wholesaler. Three years later, on April 3, 1998, the company acquired Azerty, a $350 million wholesaler of computer consumables. Azerty was founded in April 1983 by Marvin Frackt as the US subsidiary of Inter City Papers Limited of Montreal, Quebec, Canada. Bill Dueger was the first manager of Azerty, reporting to Marvin Frackt. Subsequently, the company's MicroUnited division was merged into Azerty. In July 2000, Essendant increased its geographic penetration in Canada by purchasing Azerty Canada, a $115 million computer consumables business.

To expand their line of business, on October 31, 1996, the company acquired Lagasse Bros., Inc., a wholesaler of janitorial and sanitation supplies. In January 2001, the company completed the acquisition of Peerless Pape to broaden the Lagasse division's reach.

In May 2005, Lagasse completed the purchase of Sweet Paper, which expanded Lagasse's product line and enhanced its scale and infrastructure in key markets. The company decided to sell its Canadian division in March 2006, and completed the sale of certain assets associated with its Canadian division three months later.

The company acquired ORS Nasco, on December 21, 2007. On March 1, 2010, the company acquired their first technology company, privately owned MBS Dev, a Colorado-based software provider. In November 2012, the company signed a stock purchase agreement to acquire 100% of the outstanding shares of O.K.I. Supply Co. (O.K.I.) for an all-cash purchase price of $90 million. On May 29, 2014, the company announced that its wholly owned subsidiary, United Stationers Supply Co., signed an agreement to acquire 100 percent of the outstanding shares of CPO Commerce, Inc., for an all-cash purchase price of $30 million, with up to an additional $10 million to be paid in three years based on performance.

On October 31, 2014, the company completed the acquisition of Liberty Bell Equipment Corporation, a United States wholesaler of auto aftermarket tools and supplies, and its affiliates (collectively, "MEDCO") including G2S Equipment de Fabrication et d'Entretien ULC ("G2S"), a Canadian wholesaler. On December 17, 2014, the company announced the sale of MBSDev to ProjectAX. On August 3, 2015, The company completed the acquisition of Nestor Sales LLC., a wholesaler and distributor of tools, equipment and supplies to the transportation industry. On January 31, 2019, Staples, Inc., announced that an affiliate of Sycamore Partners (which owns Staples) has acquired Essendant, a national wholesale distributor, in an example of vertical integration.
